

551001–551100 

|-bgcolor=#E9E9E9
| 551001 ||  || — || September 26, 2012 || Nogales || M. Schwartz, P. R. Holvorcem ||  || align=right | 1.3 km || 
|-id=002 bgcolor=#d6d6d6
| 551002 ||  || — || January 29, 2009 || Mount Lemmon || Mount Lemmon Survey ||  || align=right | 2.9 km || 
|-id=003 bgcolor=#d6d6d6
| 551003 ||  || — || October 26, 2012 || Haleakala || Pan-STARRS ||  || align=right | 4.2 km || 
|-id=004 bgcolor=#E9E9E9
| 551004 ||  || — || October 18, 2012 || Mount Lemmon || Mount Lemmon Survey ||  || align=right data-sort-value="0.84" | 840 m || 
|-id=005 bgcolor=#fefefe
| 551005 ||  || — || October 11, 2012 || Mount Lemmon || Mount Lemmon Survey ||  || align=right data-sort-value="0.57" | 570 m || 
|-id=006 bgcolor=#E9E9E9
| 551006 ||  || — || September 18, 2003 || Palomar || NEAT ||  || align=right | 1.5 km || 
|-id=007 bgcolor=#fefefe
| 551007 ||  || — || April 5, 2011 || Kitt Peak || Spacewatch ||  || align=right data-sort-value="0.75" | 750 m || 
|-id=008 bgcolor=#E9E9E9
| 551008 ||  || — || October 21, 2012 || Haleakala || Pan-STARRS ||  || align=right | 1.0 km || 
|-id=009 bgcolor=#E9E9E9
| 551009 ||  || — || January 17, 2005 || Kitt Peak || Spacewatch ||  || align=right | 1.2 km || 
|-id=010 bgcolor=#E9E9E9
| 551010 ||  || — || October 18, 2012 || Haleakala || Pan-STARRS ||  || align=right | 1.2 km || 
|-id=011 bgcolor=#fefefe
| 551011 ||  || — || October 19, 2012 || Haleakala || Pan-STARRS ||  || align=right data-sort-value="0.86" | 860 m || 
|-id=012 bgcolor=#fefefe
| 551012 ||  || — || October 18, 2012 || Haleakala || Pan-STARRS ||  || align=right data-sort-value="0.62" | 620 m || 
|-id=013 bgcolor=#E9E9E9
| 551013 ||  || — || October 21, 2012 || Haleakala || Pan-STARRS ||  || align=right | 1.0 km || 
|-id=014 bgcolor=#d6d6d6
| 551014 Gorman ||  ||  || October 18, 2012 || Piszkesteto || K. Sárneczky, M. Langbroek ||  || align=right | 3.7 km || 
|-id=015 bgcolor=#d6d6d6
| 551015 ||  || — || October 19, 2012 || Mount Lemmon || Mount Lemmon Survey ||  || align=right | 2.8 km || 
|-id=016 bgcolor=#d6d6d6
| 551016 ||  || — || January 20, 2015 || Haleakala || Pan-STARRS ||  || align=right | 2.4 km || 
|-id=017 bgcolor=#E9E9E9
| 551017 ||  || — || October 19, 2012 || Mount Lemmon || Mount Lemmon Survey ||  || align=right | 1.2 km || 
|-id=018 bgcolor=#E9E9E9
| 551018 ||  || — || October 16, 2012 || Kitt Peak || Spacewatch ||  || align=right | 1.0 km || 
|-id=019 bgcolor=#E9E9E9
| 551019 ||  || — || October 20, 2012 || Kitt Peak || Spacewatch ||  || align=right data-sort-value="0.78" | 780 m || 
|-id=020 bgcolor=#fefefe
| 551020 ||  || — || September 12, 1994 || Kitt Peak || Spacewatch ||  || align=right data-sort-value="0.75" | 750 m || 
|-id=021 bgcolor=#E9E9E9
| 551021 ||  || — || February 27, 2014 || Haleakala || Pan-STARRS ||  || align=right data-sort-value="0.98" | 980 m || 
|-id=022 bgcolor=#E9E9E9
| 551022 ||  || — || August 10, 2016 || Haleakala || Pan-STARRS ||  || align=right | 1.2 km || 
|-id=023 bgcolor=#d6d6d6
| 551023 ||  || — || November 5, 2005 || Catalina || CSS || Tj (2.82) || align=right | 2.5 km || 
|-id=024 bgcolor=#E9E9E9
| 551024 ||  || — || October 21, 2012 || Mount Lemmon || Mount Lemmon Survey ||  || align=right data-sort-value="0.71" | 710 m || 
|-id=025 bgcolor=#E9E9E9
| 551025 ||  || — || October 22, 2012 || Nogales || M. Schwartz, P. R. Holvorcem ||  || align=right data-sort-value="0.86" | 860 m || 
|-id=026 bgcolor=#E9E9E9
| 551026 ||  || — || October 21, 2012 || Haleakala || Pan-STARRS ||  || align=right data-sort-value="0.68" | 680 m || 
|-id=027 bgcolor=#fefefe
| 551027 ||  || — || October 21, 2012 || Haleakala || Pan-STARRS ||  || align=right data-sort-value="0.87" | 870 m || 
|-id=028 bgcolor=#E9E9E9
| 551028 ||  || — || October 23, 2012 || Mount Lemmon || Mount Lemmon Survey ||  || align=right data-sort-value="0.57" | 570 m || 
|-id=029 bgcolor=#E9E9E9
| 551029 ||  || — || September 16, 2012 || ESA OGS || ESA OGS ||  || align=right data-sort-value="0.98" | 980 m || 
|-id=030 bgcolor=#E9E9E9
| 551030 ||  || — || October 17, 2012 || Mount Lemmon || Mount Lemmon Survey ||  || align=right | 1.2 km || 
|-id=031 bgcolor=#d6d6d6
| 551031 ||  || — || October 21, 2012 || Kitt Peak || Spacewatch ||  || align=right | 2.7 km || 
|-id=032 bgcolor=#fefefe
| 551032 ||  || — || October 25, 2012 || Kitt Peak || Spacewatch ||  || align=right data-sort-value="0.75" | 750 m || 
|-id=033 bgcolor=#E9E9E9
| 551033 ||  || — || October 16, 2012 || Mount Lemmon || Mount Lemmon Survey ||  || align=right | 1.2 km || 
|-id=034 bgcolor=#E9E9E9
| 551034 ||  || — || October 21, 2012 || Mount Lemmon || Mount Lemmon Survey ||  || align=right | 1.6 km || 
|-id=035 bgcolor=#d6d6d6
| 551035 ||  || — || October 21, 2012 || Mount Lemmon || Mount Lemmon Survey ||  || align=right | 2.8 km || 
|-id=036 bgcolor=#E9E9E9
| 551036 ||  || — || October 22, 2012 || Haleakala || Pan-STARRS ||  || align=right | 1.2 km || 
|-id=037 bgcolor=#fefefe
| 551037 ||  || — || October 22, 2012 || Mount Lemmon || Mount Lemmon Survey ||  || align=right data-sort-value="0.86" | 860 m || 
|-id=038 bgcolor=#E9E9E9
| 551038 ||  || — || October 20, 2012 || Haleakala || Pan-STARRS ||  || align=right data-sort-value="0.86" | 860 m || 
|-id=039 bgcolor=#E9E9E9
| 551039 ||  || — || October 18, 2012 || Haleakala || Pan-STARRS ||  || align=right | 1.1 km || 
|-id=040 bgcolor=#fefefe
| 551040 ||  || — || April 14, 2010 || Mount Lemmon || Mount Lemmon Survey ||  || align=right data-sort-value="0.71" | 710 m || 
|-id=041 bgcolor=#fefefe
| 551041 ||  || — || October 26, 2012 || Haleakala || Pan-STARRS || H || align=right data-sort-value="0.62" | 620 m || 
|-id=042 bgcolor=#fefefe
| 551042 ||  || — || October 8, 2008 || Mount Lemmon || Mount Lemmon Survey ||  || align=right data-sort-value="0.75" | 750 m || 
|-id=043 bgcolor=#d6d6d6
| 551043 ||  || — || October 11, 2006 || Palomar || NEAT || (1118) || align=right | 4.5 km || 
|-id=044 bgcolor=#d6d6d6
| 551044 ||  || — || November 4, 2012 || Mount Lemmon || Mount Lemmon Survey ||  || align=right | 2.5 km || 
|-id=045 bgcolor=#fefefe
| 551045 ||  || — || October 18, 2012 || Haleakala || Pan-STARRS ||  || align=right data-sort-value="0.75" | 750 m || 
|-id=046 bgcolor=#d6d6d6
| 551046 ||  || — || February 13, 2002 || Apache Point || SDSS Collaboration || 7:4 || align=right | 4.3 km || 
|-id=047 bgcolor=#d6d6d6
| 551047 ||  || — || October 22, 2012 || Kitt Peak || Spacewatch || 7:4 || align=right | 2.9 km || 
|-id=048 bgcolor=#fefefe
| 551048 ||  || — || May 22, 2011 || Mount Lemmon || Mount Lemmon Survey || H || align=right data-sort-value="0.62" | 620 m || 
|-id=049 bgcolor=#fefefe
| 551049 ||  || — || October 18, 2001 || Palomar || NEAT ||  || align=right data-sort-value="0.86" | 860 m || 
|-id=050 bgcolor=#E9E9E9
| 551050 ||  || — || September 15, 2003 || Palomar || NEAT ||  || align=right | 1.6 km || 
|-id=051 bgcolor=#fefefe
| 551051 ||  || — || October 21, 2012 || Haleakala || Pan-STARRS ||  || align=right data-sort-value="0.65" | 650 m || 
|-id=052 bgcolor=#fefefe
| 551052 ||  || — || January 31, 2006 || Kitt Peak || Spacewatch ||  || align=right data-sort-value="0.71" | 710 m || 
|-id=053 bgcolor=#fefefe
| 551053 ||  || — || October 15, 2012 || Kitt Peak || Spacewatch ||  || align=right data-sort-value="0.62" | 620 m || 
|-id=054 bgcolor=#d6d6d6
| 551054 ||  || — || October 8, 2012 || Kitt Peak || Spacewatch ||  || align=right | 3.1 km || 
|-id=055 bgcolor=#fefefe
| 551055 ||  || — || September 29, 2005 || Mount Lemmon || Mount Lemmon Survey ||  || align=right data-sort-value="0.84" | 840 m || 
|-id=056 bgcolor=#fefefe
| 551056 ||  || — || October 22, 2005 || Kitt Peak || Spacewatch ||  || align=right data-sort-value="0.75" | 750 m || 
|-id=057 bgcolor=#fefefe
| 551057 ||  || — || October 25, 2005 || Kitt Peak || Spacewatch ||  || align=right data-sort-value="0.71" | 710 m || 
|-id=058 bgcolor=#E9E9E9
| 551058 ||  || — || July 5, 2003 || Kitt Peak || Spacewatch ||  || align=right | 1.8 km || 
|-id=059 bgcolor=#E9E9E9
| 551059 ||  || — || October 17, 2012 || Mount Lemmon || Mount Lemmon Survey ||  || align=right data-sort-value="0.75" | 750 m || 
|-id=060 bgcolor=#fefefe
| 551060 ||  || — || October 20, 2012 || Mount Lemmon || Mount Lemmon Survey ||  || align=right data-sort-value="0.78" | 780 m || 
|-id=061 bgcolor=#E9E9E9
| 551061 ||  || — || November 20, 2008 || Mount Lemmon || Mount Lemmon Survey ||  || align=right | 1.3 km || 
|-id=062 bgcolor=#d6d6d6
| 551062 ||  || — || December 24, 2005 || Kitt Peak || Spacewatch || 3:2 || align=right | 3.7 km || 
|-id=063 bgcolor=#d6d6d6
| 551063 ||  || — || April 15, 2010 || Mount Lemmon || Mount Lemmon Survey ||  || align=right | 3.2 km || 
|-id=064 bgcolor=#d6d6d6
| 551064 ||  || — || November 2, 2012 || Mount Lemmon || Mount Lemmon Survey ||  || align=right | 2.9 km || 
|-id=065 bgcolor=#fefefe
| 551065 ||  || — || September 7, 2008 || Mount Lemmon || Mount Lemmon Survey ||  || align=right data-sort-value="0.94" | 940 m || 
|-id=066 bgcolor=#d6d6d6
| 551066 ||  || — || May 14, 2005 || Mount Lemmon || Mount Lemmon Survey ||  || align=right | 2.5 km || 
|-id=067 bgcolor=#d6d6d6
| 551067 ||  || — || November 6, 2012 || Mount Lemmon || Mount Lemmon Survey ||  || align=right | 2.9 km || 
|-id=068 bgcolor=#d6d6d6
| 551068 ||  || — || August 13, 2006 || Palomar || NEAT || TIR || align=right | 2.8 km || 
|-id=069 bgcolor=#fefefe
| 551069 ||  || — || March 16, 2004 || Kitt Peak || Spacewatch ||  || align=right data-sort-value="0.75" | 750 m || 
|-id=070 bgcolor=#E9E9E9
| 551070 ||  || — || October 8, 2012 || Kitt Peak || Spacewatch ||  || align=right | 1.0 km || 
|-id=071 bgcolor=#fefefe
| 551071 ||  || — || October 20, 2012 || Kitt Peak || Spacewatch ||  || align=right data-sort-value="0.57" | 570 m || 
|-id=072 bgcolor=#d6d6d6
| 551072 ||  || — || April 20, 2004 || Kitt Peak || Spacewatch ||  || align=right | 3.1 km || 
|-id=073 bgcolor=#fefefe
| 551073 ||  || — || December 28, 2005 || Kitt Peak || Spacewatch ||  || align=right data-sort-value="0.57" | 570 m || 
|-id=074 bgcolor=#fefefe
| 551074 ||  || — || August 31, 2005 || Palomar || NEAT ||  || align=right data-sort-value="0.71" | 710 m || 
|-id=075 bgcolor=#d6d6d6
| 551075 ||  || — || October 22, 2012 || Haleakala || Pan-STARRS ||  || align=right | 2.7 km || 
|-id=076 bgcolor=#fefefe
| 551076 ||  || — || December 26, 2005 || Kitt Peak || Spacewatch ||  || align=right data-sort-value="0.57" | 570 m || 
|-id=077 bgcolor=#E9E9E9
| 551077 ||  || — || October 18, 2012 || Haleakala || Pan-STARRS ||  || align=right | 1.2 km || 
|-id=078 bgcolor=#fefefe
| 551078 ||  || — || November 12, 2012 || Mount Lemmon || Mount Lemmon Survey ||  || align=right data-sort-value="0.78" | 780 m || 
|-id=079 bgcolor=#d6d6d6
| 551079 ||  || — || April 11, 2005 || Kitt Peak || Kitt Peak Obs. ||  || align=right | 2.4 km || 
|-id=080 bgcolor=#fefefe
| 551080 ||  || — || January 23, 2006 || Kitt Peak || Spacewatch ||  || align=right data-sort-value="0.65" | 650 m || 
|-id=081 bgcolor=#fefefe
| 551081 ||  || — || October 20, 2012 || Mount Lemmon || Mount Lemmon Survey ||  || align=right data-sort-value="0.75" | 750 m || 
|-id=082 bgcolor=#fefefe
| 551082 ||  || — || October 20, 2012 || Haleakala || Pan-STARRS ||  || align=right data-sort-value="0.75" | 750 m || 
|-id=083 bgcolor=#fefefe
| 551083 ||  || — || September 11, 2005 || Kitt Peak || Spacewatch ||  || align=right data-sort-value="0.65" | 650 m || 
|-id=084 bgcolor=#fefefe
| 551084 ||  || — || February 17, 2010 || Mount Lemmon || Mount Lemmon Survey ||  || align=right data-sort-value="0.86" | 860 m || 
|-id=085 bgcolor=#d6d6d6
| 551085 ||  || — || October 17, 2012 || Mount Lemmon || Mount Lemmon Survey ||  || align=right | 3.5 km || 
|-id=086 bgcolor=#fefefe
| 551086 ||  || — || October 12, 2012 || Oukaimeden || C. Rinner ||  || align=right data-sort-value="0.82" | 820 m || 
|-id=087 bgcolor=#E9E9E9
| 551087 ||  || — || November 14, 2012 || Kitt Peak || Spacewatch ||  || align=right | 1.5 km || 
|-id=088 bgcolor=#fefefe
| 551088 ||  || — || January 29, 2003 || Apache Point || SDSS Collaboration || V || align=right data-sort-value="0.71" | 710 m || 
|-id=089 bgcolor=#fefefe
| 551089 ||  || — || October 24, 2001 || Palomar || NEAT ||  || align=right data-sort-value="0.94" | 940 m || 
|-id=090 bgcolor=#fefefe
| 551090 ||  || — || January 21, 2006 || Mount Lemmon || Mount Lemmon Survey ||  || align=right data-sort-value="0.68" | 680 m || 
|-id=091 bgcolor=#d6d6d6
| 551091 Flórferenc ||  ||  || October 22, 2012 || Piszkesteto || G. Hodosán ||  || align=right | 4.2 km || 
|-id=092 bgcolor=#d6d6d6
| 551092 ||  || — || March 27, 2003 || Kitt Peak || Spacewatch || Tj (2.99) || align=right | 2.8 km || 
|-id=093 bgcolor=#fefefe
| 551093 ||  || — || September 11, 2001 || Kitt Peak || Spacewatch ||  || align=right data-sort-value="0.75" | 750 m || 
|-id=094 bgcolor=#d6d6d6
| 551094 ||  || — || October 14, 2012 || Kitt Peak || Spacewatch ||  || align=right | 3.2 km || 
|-id=095 bgcolor=#E9E9E9
| 551095 ||  || — || October 22, 2012 || Haleakala || Pan-STARRS ||  || align=right | 1.4 km || 
|-id=096 bgcolor=#E9E9E9
| 551096 ||  || — || December 29, 2008 || Mount Lemmon || Mount Lemmon Survey ||  || align=right | 1.5 km || 
|-id=097 bgcolor=#d6d6d6
| 551097 ||  || — || September 30, 2011 || Haleakala || Pan-STARRS ||  || align=right | 2.7 km || 
|-id=098 bgcolor=#E9E9E9
| 551098 ||  || — || November 14, 2012 || Kitt Peak || Spacewatch ||  || align=right | 1.1 km || 
|-id=099 bgcolor=#fefefe
| 551099 ||  || — || November 12, 2012 || Mount Lemmon || Mount Lemmon Survey ||  || align=right data-sort-value="0.82" | 820 m || 
|-id=100 bgcolor=#E9E9E9
| 551100 ||  || — || November 7, 2012 || Nogales || M. Schwartz, P. R. Holvorcem ||  || align=right | 1.7 km || 
|}

551101–551200 

|-bgcolor=#E9E9E9
| 551101 ||  || — || November 13, 2012 || Mount Lemmon || Mount Lemmon Survey ||  || align=right | 1.2 km || 
|-id=102 bgcolor=#d6d6d6
| 551102 ||  || — || October 16, 2006 || Catalina || CSS ||  || align=right | 2.8 km || 
|-id=103 bgcolor=#E9E9E9
| 551103 ||  || — || November 2, 2012 || Catalina || CSS ||  || align=right data-sort-value="0.78" | 780 m || 
|-id=104 bgcolor=#E9E9E9
| 551104 ||  || — || November 13, 2012 || Kitt Peak || Spacewatch ||  || align=right | 1.4 km || 
|-id=105 bgcolor=#E9E9E9
| 551105 ||  || — || November 14, 2012 || Mount Lemmon || Mount Lemmon Survey ||  || align=right | 2.3 km || 
|-id=106 bgcolor=#fefefe
| 551106 ||  || — || November 13, 2012 || Mount Lemmon || Mount Lemmon Survey || H || align=right data-sort-value="0.59" | 590 m || 
|-id=107 bgcolor=#E9E9E9
| 551107 ||  || — || November 13, 2012 || Mount Lemmon || Mount Lemmon Survey ||  || align=right | 1.3 km || 
|-id=108 bgcolor=#fefefe
| 551108 ||  || — || November 13, 2012 || Mount Lemmon || Mount Lemmon Survey ||  || align=right data-sort-value="0.54" | 540 m || 
|-id=109 bgcolor=#fefefe
| 551109 ||  || — || September 23, 2008 || Mount Lemmon || Mount Lemmon Survey ||  || align=right data-sort-value="0.82" | 820 m || 
|-id=110 bgcolor=#fefefe
| 551110 ||  || — || October 7, 2005 || Mauna Kea || Mauna Kea Obs. || NYS || align=right data-sort-value="0.66" | 660 m || 
|-id=111 bgcolor=#E9E9E9
| 551111 ||  || — || June 26, 2011 || Mount Lemmon || Mount Lemmon Survey ||  || align=right | 2.0 km || 
|-id=112 bgcolor=#E9E9E9
| 551112 ||  || — || November 19, 2012 || Kitt Peak || Spacewatch ||  || align=right data-sort-value="0.96" | 960 m || 
|-id=113 bgcolor=#d6d6d6
| 551113 ||  || — || November 16, 2001 || Kitt Peak || Spacewatch ||  || align=right | 3.9 km || 
|-id=114 bgcolor=#fefefe
| 551114 ||  || — || October 22, 2012 || Mount Lemmon || Mount Lemmon Survey || CLA || align=right | 1.3 km || 
|-id=115 bgcolor=#E9E9E9
| 551115 ||  || — || November 6, 2012 || Kitt Peak || Spacewatch ||  || align=right | 1.2 km || 
|-id=116 bgcolor=#E9E9E9
| 551116 ||  || — || November 6, 2012 || Kitt Peak || Spacewatch ||  || align=right data-sort-value="0.88" | 880 m || 
|-id=117 bgcolor=#fefefe
| 551117 ||  || — || October 8, 2008 || Kitt Peak || Spacewatch ||  || align=right data-sort-value="0.94" | 940 m || 
|-id=118 bgcolor=#fefefe
| 551118 ||  || — || November 13, 2002 || Palomar || NEAT ||  || align=right data-sort-value="0.82" | 820 m || 
|-id=119 bgcolor=#fefefe
| 551119 ||  || — || November 23, 2012 || Oukaimeden || C. Rinner ||  || align=right data-sort-value="0.90" | 900 m || 
|-id=120 bgcolor=#E9E9E9
| 551120 ||  || — || October 19, 2012 || Mount Lemmon || Mount Lemmon Survey ||  || align=right | 1.1 km || 
|-id=121 bgcolor=#fefefe
| 551121 ||  || — || November 20, 2012 || Mount Lemmon || Mount Lemmon Survey ||  || align=right data-sort-value="0.54" | 540 m || 
|-id=122 bgcolor=#d6d6d6
| 551122 ||  || — || November 7, 2012 || Haleakala || Pan-STARRS ||  || align=right | 2.9 km || 
|-id=123 bgcolor=#E9E9E9
| 551123 ||  || — || November 19, 2012 || Kitt Peak || Spacewatch ||  || align=right | 1.1 km || 
|-id=124 bgcolor=#fefefe
| 551124 ||  || — || October 27, 2005 || Mount Lemmon || Mount Lemmon Survey ||  || align=right data-sort-value="0.96" | 960 m || 
|-id=125 bgcolor=#fefefe
| 551125 ||  || — || November 26, 2012 || Mount Lemmon || Mount Lemmon Survey ||  || align=right data-sort-value="0.86" | 860 m || 
|-id=126 bgcolor=#E9E9E9
| 551126 ||  || — || September 25, 2016 || Haleakala || Pan-STARRS ||  || align=right | 1.1 km || 
|-id=127 bgcolor=#E9E9E9
| 551127 ||  || — || November 20, 2012 || Mount Lemmon || Mount Lemmon Survey ||  || align=right | 1.8 km || 
|-id=128 bgcolor=#fefefe
| 551128 ||  || — || November 26, 2012 || Mount Lemmon || Mount Lemmon Survey || H || align=right data-sort-value="0.62" | 620 m || 
|-id=129 bgcolor=#d6d6d6
| 551129 ||  || — || September 4, 2011 || Kitt Peak || Spacewatch ||  || align=right | 3.4 km || 
|-id=130 bgcolor=#E9E9E9
| 551130 ||  || — || November 6, 2012 || Kitt Peak || Spacewatch ||  || align=right | 2.0 km || 
|-id=131 bgcolor=#E9E9E9
| 551131 ||  || — || November 23, 2012 || Kitt Peak || Spacewatch ||  || align=right data-sort-value="0.86" | 860 m || 
|-id=132 bgcolor=#d6d6d6
| 551132 ||  || — || May 19, 1993 || Kitt Peak || Spacewatch ||  || align=right | 3.0 km || 
|-id=133 bgcolor=#fefefe
| 551133 ||  || — || December 4, 2012 || Mount Lemmon || Mount Lemmon Survey || H || align=right data-sort-value="0.71" | 710 m || 
|-id=134 bgcolor=#d6d6d6
| 551134 ||  || — || June 18, 2006 || Palomar || NEAT ||  || align=right | 2.7 km || 
|-id=135 bgcolor=#fefefe
| 551135 ||  || — || November 12, 2012 || Kitt Peak || Spacewatch || H || align=right data-sort-value="0.68" | 680 m || 
|-id=136 bgcolor=#d6d6d6
| 551136 ||  || — || October 1, 2005 || Kitt Peak || Spacewatch || 7:4 || align=right | 3.5 km || 
|-id=137 bgcolor=#E9E9E9
| 551137 ||  || — || November 5, 2012 || Nogales || M. Schwartz, P. R. Holvorcem ||  || align=right | 1.8 km || 
|-id=138 bgcolor=#fefefe
| 551138 ||  || — || January 11, 2008 || Mount Lemmon || Mount Lemmon Survey || H || align=right data-sort-value="0.59" | 590 m || 
|-id=139 bgcolor=#E9E9E9
| 551139 ||  || — || September 11, 2007 || Mount Lemmon || Mount Lemmon Survey ||  || align=right | 1.6 km || 
|-id=140 bgcolor=#fefefe
| 551140 ||  || — || November 7, 2012 || Mount Lemmon || Mount Lemmon Survey ||  || align=right data-sort-value="0.86" | 860 m || 
|-id=141 bgcolor=#E9E9E9
| 551141 ||  || — || November 24, 2012 || Kitt Peak || Spacewatch ||  || align=right | 1.0 km || 
|-id=142 bgcolor=#fefefe
| 551142 ||  || — || October 9, 2008 || Mount Lemmon || Mount Lemmon Survey ||  || align=right data-sort-value="0.75" | 750 m || 
|-id=143 bgcolor=#E9E9E9
| 551143 ||  || — || December 22, 2008 || Kitt Peak || Spacewatch || MIS || align=right | 2.1 km || 
|-id=144 bgcolor=#E9E9E9
| 551144 ||  || — || December 3, 2012 || Mount Lemmon || Mount Lemmon Survey ||  || align=right | 1.3 km || 
|-id=145 bgcolor=#E9E9E9
| 551145 ||  || — || January 2, 2009 || Mount Lemmon || Mount Lemmon Survey ||  || align=right | 1.2 km || 
|-id=146 bgcolor=#E9E9E9
| 551146 ||  || — || November 22, 2012 || Nogales || M. Schwartz, P. R. Holvorcem ||  || align=right | 1.4 km || 
|-id=147 bgcolor=#E9E9E9
| 551147 ||  || — || October 15, 2007 || Mount Lemmon || Mount Lemmon Survey ||  || align=right | 1.4 km || 
|-id=148 bgcolor=#fefefe
| 551148 ||  || — || December 17, 2001 || Socorro || LINEAR ||  || align=right data-sort-value="0.94" | 940 m || 
|-id=149 bgcolor=#d6d6d6
| 551149 ||  || — || October 16, 2012 || Kitt Peak || Spacewatch ||  || align=right | 2.8 km || 
|-id=150 bgcolor=#E9E9E9
| 551150 ||  || — || October 24, 2003 || Apache Point || SDSS Collaboration ||  || align=right | 1.2 km || 
|-id=151 bgcolor=#E9E9E9
| 551151 ||  || — || November 20, 2003 || Palomar || NEAT ||  || align=right | 1.7 km || 
|-id=152 bgcolor=#fefefe
| 551152 ||  || — || April 12, 2011 || Mount Lemmon || Mount Lemmon Survey || H || align=right data-sort-value="0.65" | 650 m || 
|-id=153 bgcolor=#FA8072
| 551153 ||  || — || December 9, 2012 || Mount Lemmon || Mount Lemmon Survey ||  || align=right | 1.8 km || 
|-id=154 bgcolor=#fefefe
| 551154 ||  || — || January 31, 2003 || Palomar || NEAT || H || align=right data-sort-value="0.80" | 800 m || 
|-id=155 bgcolor=#fefefe
| 551155 ||  || — || December 10, 2012 || Haleakala || Pan-STARRS || H || align=right data-sort-value="0.65" | 650 m || 
|-id=156 bgcolor=#E9E9E9
| 551156 ||  || — || December 21, 2008 || Mount Lemmon || Mount Lemmon Survey ||  || align=right | 1.3 km || 
|-id=157 bgcolor=#E9E9E9
| 551157 ||  || — || June 5, 2011 || Mount Lemmon || Mount Lemmon Survey ||  || align=right | 1.3 km || 
|-id=158 bgcolor=#E9E9E9
| 551158 ||  || — || December 4, 2012 || Mount Lemmon || Mount Lemmon Survey ||  || align=right | 1.3 km || 
|-id=159 bgcolor=#E9E9E9
| 551159 ||  || — || November 15, 2012 || Nogales || M. Schwartz, P. R. Holvorcem || (194) || align=right | 1.5 km || 
|-id=160 bgcolor=#E9E9E9
| 551160 ||  || — || December 4, 2012 || Mount Lemmon || Mount Lemmon Survey ||  || align=right data-sort-value="0.90" | 900 m || 
|-id=161 bgcolor=#fefefe
| 551161 ||  || — || September 5, 2008 || Kitt Peak || Spacewatch ||  || align=right data-sort-value="0.75" | 750 m || 
|-id=162 bgcolor=#fefefe
| 551162 ||  || — || December 5, 2012 || Mount Lemmon || Mount Lemmon Survey ||  || align=right data-sort-value="0.71" | 710 m || 
|-id=163 bgcolor=#d6d6d6
| 551163 ||  || — || January 11, 2008 || Mount Lemmon || Mount Lemmon Survey ||  || align=right | 3.2 km || 
|-id=164 bgcolor=#fefefe
| 551164 ||  || — || September 28, 2008 || Mount Lemmon || Mount Lemmon Survey ||  || align=right data-sort-value="0.75" | 750 m || 
|-id=165 bgcolor=#fefefe
| 551165 ||  || — || January 30, 2003 || Kitt Peak || Spacewatch ||  || align=right data-sort-value="0.86" | 860 m || 
|-id=166 bgcolor=#E9E9E9
| 551166 ||  || — || December 6, 2012 || Mount Lemmon || Mount Lemmon Survey ||  || align=right | 1.1 km || 
|-id=167 bgcolor=#E9E9E9
| 551167 ||  || — || November 7, 2012 || Kitt Peak || Spacewatch ||  || align=right data-sort-value="0.78" | 780 m || 
|-id=168 bgcolor=#d6d6d6
| 551168 ||  || — || July 11, 2005 || Mount Lemmon || Mount Lemmon Survey ||  || align=right | 3.0 km || 
|-id=169 bgcolor=#fefefe
| 551169 ||  || — || December 8, 2012 || Mount Lemmon || Mount Lemmon Survey ||  || align=right data-sort-value="0.59" | 590 m || 
|-id=170 bgcolor=#d6d6d6
| 551170 ||  || — || December 8, 2012 || Mount Lemmon || Mount Lemmon Survey || 7:4 || align=right | 3.5 km || 
|-id=171 bgcolor=#d6d6d6
| 551171 ||  || — || December 8, 2012 || Mount Lemmon || Mount Lemmon Survey ||  || align=right | 2.7 km || 
|-id=172 bgcolor=#E9E9E9
| 551172 ||  || — || December 30, 2008 || Kitt Peak || Spacewatch ||  || align=right | 1.2 km || 
|-id=173 bgcolor=#fefefe
| 551173 ||  || — || December 5, 2012 || Mount Lemmon || Mount Lemmon Survey ||  || align=right | 1.1 km || 
|-id=174 bgcolor=#fefefe
| 551174 ||  || — || March 13, 2010 || Mount Lemmon || Mount Lemmon Survey ||  || align=right data-sort-value="0.68" | 680 m || 
|-id=175 bgcolor=#E9E9E9
| 551175 ||  || — || September 15, 2007 || Kitt Peak || Spacewatch ||  || align=right | 1.3 km || 
|-id=176 bgcolor=#E9E9E9
| 551176 ||  || — || November 12, 2012 || Nogales || M. Schwartz, P. R. Holvorcem ||  || align=right | 2.8 km || 
|-id=177 bgcolor=#E9E9E9
| 551177 ||  || — || December 8, 2012 || Mount Lemmon || Mount Lemmon Survey ||  || align=right | 1.6 km || 
|-id=178 bgcolor=#E9E9E9
| 551178 ||  || — || October 11, 2007 || Mount Lemmon || Mount Lemmon Survey ||  || align=right | 1.9 km || 
|-id=179 bgcolor=#E9E9E9
| 551179 ||  || — || March 4, 2005 || Mount Lemmon || Mount Lemmon Survey ||  || align=right | 2.0 km || 
|-id=180 bgcolor=#fefefe
| 551180 ||  || — || December 7, 2012 || Haleakala || Pan-STARRS ||  || align=right data-sort-value="0.90" | 900 m || 
|-id=181 bgcolor=#fefefe
| 551181 ||  || — || September 29, 1992 || Kitt Peak || Spacewatch ||  || align=right | 1.1 km || 
|-id=182 bgcolor=#E9E9E9
| 551182 ||  || — || December 8, 2012 || Kitt Peak || Spacewatch ||  || align=right | 1.7 km || 
|-id=183 bgcolor=#E9E9E9
| 551183 ||  || — || December 8, 2012 || Kitt Peak || Spacewatch ||  || align=right data-sort-value="0.98" | 980 m || 
|-id=184 bgcolor=#fefefe
| 551184 ||  || — || February 16, 2010 || Mount Lemmon || Mount Lemmon Survey ||  || align=right data-sort-value="0.98" | 980 m || 
|-id=185 bgcolor=#fefefe
| 551185 ||  || — || December 12, 2012 || Catalina || CSS || H || align=right data-sort-value="0.82" | 820 m || 
|-id=186 bgcolor=#E9E9E9
| 551186 ||  || — || November 24, 2008 || Mount Lemmon || Mount Lemmon Survey ||  || align=right data-sort-value="0.82" | 820 m || 
|-id=187 bgcolor=#fefefe
| 551187 ||  || — || December 12, 2012 || Haleakala || Pan-STARRS || H || align=right data-sort-value="0.57" | 570 m || 
|-id=188 bgcolor=#E9E9E9
| 551188 ||  || — || December 8, 2012 || Kitt Peak || Spacewatch ||  || align=right data-sort-value="0.98" | 980 m || 
|-id=189 bgcolor=#E9E9E9
| 551189 ||  || — || December 6, 2012 || Nogales || M. Schwartz, P. R. Holvorcem ||  || align=right | 1.3 km || 
|-id=190 bgcolor=#E9E9E9
| 551190 ||  || — || October 9, 2012 || Mount Lemmon || Mount Lemmon Survey ||  || align=right data-sort-value="0.68" | 680 m || 
|-id=191 bgcolor=#fefefe
| 551191 ||  || — || December 3, 2012 || Mount Lemmon || Mount Lemmon Survey || H || align=right data-sort-value="0.59" | 590 m || 
|-id=192 bgcolor=#E9E9E9
| 551192 ||  || — || February 7, 1997 || Kitt Peak || Spacewatch ||  || align=right | 1.5 km || 
|-id=193 bgcolor=#fefefe
| 551193 ||  || — || October 20, 2008 || Mount Lemmon || Mount Lemmon Survey ||  || align=right data-sort-value="0.59" | 590 m || 
|-id=194 bgcolor=#E9E9E9
| 551194 ||  || — || January 1, 2009 || Kitt Peak || Spacewatch ||  || align=right | 1.9 km || 
|-id=195 bgcolor=#fefefe
| 551195 ||  || — || October 15, 2001 || Kitt Peak || Spacewatch ||  || align=right data-sort-value="0.71" | 710 m || 
|-id=196 bgcolor=#E9E9E9
| 551196 ||  || — || November 24, 2008 || Kitt Peak || Spacewatch ||  || align=right | 1.1 km || 
|-id=197 bgcolor=#fefefe
| 551197 ||  || — || May 29, 2011 || Mount Lemmon || Mount Lemmon Survey || H || align=right data-sort-value="0.68" | 680 m || 
|-id=198 bgcolor=#fefefe
| 551198 ||  || — || September 29, 2008 || Mount Lemmon || Mount Lemmon Survey ||  || align=right | 1.4 km || 
|-id=199 bgcolor=#fefefe
| 551199 ||  || — || July 29, 2008 || Kitt Peak || Spacewatch ||  || align=right data-sort-value="0.78" | 780 m || 
|-id=200 bgcolor=#FA8072
| 551200 ||  || — || July 19, 2001 || Palomar || NEAT ||  || align=right data-sort-value="0.98" | 980 m || 
|}

551201–551300 

|-bgcolor=#fefefe
| 551201 ||  || — || December 8, 2012 || Mount Lemmon || Mount Lemmon Survey ||  || align=right data-sort-value="0.90" | 900 m || 
|-id=202 bgcolor=#fefefe
| 551202 ||  || — || December 8, 2012 || Mount Lemmon || Mount Lemmon Survey ||  || align=right data-sort-value="0.82" | 820 m || 
|-id=203 bgcolor=#fefefe
| 551203 ||  || — || April 29, 2014 || Haleakala || Pan-STARRS ||  || align=right data-sort-value="0.86" | 860 m || 
|-id=204 bgcolor=#E9E9E9
| 551204 ||  || — || October 28, 2016 || Haleakala || Pan-STARRS ||  || align=right data-sort-value="0.98" | 980 m || 
|-id=205 bgcolor=#d6d6d6
| 551205 ||  || — || June 11, 2016 || Mount Lemmon || Mount Lemmon Survey || 7:4 || align=right | 2.8 km || 
|-id=206 bgcolor=#E9E9E9
| 551206 ||  || — || December 18, 2012 || Calar Alto-CASADO || S. Mottola ||  || align=right data-sort-value="0.92" | 920 m || 
|-id=207 bgcolor=#E9E9E9
| 551207 ||  || — || November 2, 2008 || Mount Lemmon || Mount Lemmon Survey ||  || align=right | 1.7 km || 
|-id=208 bgcolor=#fefefe
| 551208 ||  || — || December 7, 2012 || Haleakala || Pan-STARRS || H || align=right data-sort-value="0.57" | 570 m || 
|-id=209 bgcolor=#fefefe
| 551209 ||  || — || December 13, 2012 || Haleakala || Pan-STARRS || H || align=right data-sort-value="0.49" | 490 m || 
|-id=210 bgcolor=#d6d6d6
| 551210 ||  || — || December 22, 2012 || Haleakala || Pan-STARRS ||  || align=right | 2.5 km || 
|-id=211 bgcolor=#fefefe
| 551211 ||  || — || December 7, 1999 || Socorro || LINEAR || H || align=right data-sort-value="0.75" | 750 m || 
|-id=212 bgcolor=#d6d6d6
| 551212 ||  || — || June 3, 2003 || Kitt Peak || Spacewatch ||  || align=right | 2.7 km || 
|-id=213 bgcolor=#E9E9E9
| 551213 ||  || — || October 6, 2012 || Haleakala || Pan-STARRS ||  || align=right | 1.2 km || 
|-id=214 bgcolor=#fefefe
| 551214 ||  || — || August 15, 2001 || Haleakala || AMOS || H || align=right data-sort-value="0.90" | 900 m || 
|-id=215 bgcolor=#C2FFFF
| 551215 ||  || — || September 16, 2009 || Kitt Peak || Spacewatch || L4 || align=right | 5.9 km || 
|-id=216 bgcolor=#E9E9E9
| 551216 ||  || — || November 12, 2007 || Mount Lemmon || Mount Lemmon Survey ||  || align=right | 1.8 km || 
|-id=217 bgcolor=#E9E9E9
| 551217 ||  || — || December 22, 2012 || Haleakala || Pan-STARRS ||  || align=right | 1.5 km || 
|-id=218 bgcolor=#C2FFFF
| 551218 ||  || — || December 23, 2012 || Haleakala || Pan-STARRS || L4 || align=right | 7.6 km || 
|-id=219 bgcolor=#fefefe
| 551219 ||  || — || July 24, 2015 || Haleakala || Pan-STARRS ||  || align=right data-sort-value="0.86" | 860 m || 
|-id=220 bgcolor=#fefefe
| 551220 ||  || — || January 31, 2016 || Haleakala || Pan-STARRS || H || align=right data-sort-value="0.57" | 570 m || 
|-id=221 bgcolor=#E9E9E9
| 551221 ||  || — || December 22, 2012 || Haleakala || Pan-STARRS ||  || align=right | 1.1 km || 
|-id=222 bgcolor=#fefefe
| 551222 ||  || — || December 9, 2012 || Mount Lemmon || Mount Lemmon Survey || H || align=right data-sort-value="0.51" | 510 m || 
|-id=223 bgcolor=#E9E9E9
| 551223 ||  || — || December 3, 2012 || Mount Lemmon || Mount Lemmon Survey ||  || align=right data-sort-value="0.98" | 980 m || 
|-id=224 bgcolor=#fefefe
| 551224 ||  || — || October 30, 2008 || Mount Lemmon || Mount Lemmon Survey ||  || align=right data-sort-value="0.65" | 650 m || 
|-id=225 bgcolor=#E9E9E9
| 551225 ||  || — || January 3, 2013 || Mount Lemmon || Mount Lemmon Survey ||  || align=right | 1.1 km || 
|-id=226 bgcolor=#fefefe
| 551226 ||  || — || January 3, 2013 || Mount Lemmon || Mount Lemmon Survey ||  || align=right data-sort-value="0.68" | 680 m || 
|-id=227 bgcolor=#fefefe
| 551227 ||  || — || October 8, 2008 || Mount Lemmon || Mount Lemmon Survey ||  || align=right data-sort-value="0.71" | 710 m || 
|-id=228 bgcolor=#fefefe
| 551228 ||  || — || March 4, 2006 || Kitt Peak || Spacewatch ||  || align=right data-sort-value="0.75" | 750 m || 
|-id=229 bgcolor=#fefefe
| 551229 ||  || — || January 3, 2013 || Haleakala || Pan-STARRS ||  || align=right data-sort-value="0.94" | 940 m || 
|-id=230 bgcolor=#E9E9E9
| 551230 ||  || — || August 23, 2003 || Palomar || NEAT ||  || align=right | 1.4 km || 
|-id=231 bgcolor=#fefefe
| 551231 Żywiec ||  ||  || January 4, 2013 || Tincana || M. Żołnowski, M. Kusiak ||  || align=right data-sort-value="0.75" | 750 m || 
|-id=232 bgcolor=#fefefe
| 551232 ||  || — || January 5, 2013 || Mount Lemmon || Mount Lemmon Survey ||  || align=right data-sort-value="0.68" | 680 m || 
|-id=233 bgcolor=#fefefe
| 551233 Miguelanton ||  ||  || August 23, 2006 || Pla D'Arguines || R. Ferrando, M. Ferrando || H || align=right data-sort-value="0.62" | 620 m || 
|-id=234 bgcolor=#fefefe
| 551234 ||  || — || January 1, 2013 || Haleakala || Pan-STARRS ||  || align=right | 1.0 km || 
|-id=235 bgcolor=#fefefe
| 551235 ||  || — || November 25, 2000 || Kitt Peak || Spacewatch || NYS || align=right data-sort-value="0.76" | 760 m || 
|-id=236 bgcolor=#fefefe
| 551236 ||  || — || April 4, 2002 || Palomar || NEAT ||  || align=right data-sort-value="0.99" | 990 m || 
|-id=237 bgcolor=#E9E9E9
| 551237 ||  || — || September 5, 1999 || Kitt Peak || Spacewatch ||  || align=right | 1.1 km || 
|-id=238 bgcolor=#fefefe
| 551238 ||  || — || September 23, 2001 || Palomar || NEAT || H || align=right data-sort-value="0.62" | 620 m || 
|-id=239 bgcolor=#fefefe
| 551239 ||  || — || January 3, 2013 || Haleakala || Pan-STARRS || H || align=right data-sort-value="0.61" | 610 m || 
|-id=240 bgcolor=#E9E9E9
| 551240 ||  || — || December 21, 2012 || Catalina || CSS ||  || align=right | 1.6 km || 
|-id=241 bgcolor=#fefefe
| 551241 ||  || — || November 1, 2008 || Mount Lemmon || Mount Lemmon Survey || NYS || align=right data-sort-value="0.50" | 500 m || 
|-id=242 bgcolor=#fefefe
| 551242 ||  || — || January 5, 2013 || Kitt Peak || Spacewatch ||  || align=right data-sort-value="0.59" | 590 m || 
|-id=243 bgcolor=#fefefe
| 551243 ||  || — || January 5, 2013 || Kitt Peak || Spacewatch || NYS || align=right data-sort-value="0.60" | 600 m || 
|-id=244 bgcolor=#fefefe
| 551244 ||  || — || December 4, 2008 || Kitt Peak || Spacewatch ||  || align=right data-sort-value="0.65" | 650 m || 
|-id=245 bgcolor=#fefefe
| 551245 ||  || — || January 5, 2013 || Kitt Peak || Spacewatch || NYS || align=right data-sort-value="0.69" | 690 m || 
|-id=246 bgcolor=#fefefe
| 551246 ||  || — || December 13, 2004 || Kitt Peak || Spacewatch ||  || align=right | 1.2 km || 
|-id=247 bgcolor=#fefefe
| 551247 ||  || — || October 21, 2008 || Kitt Peak || Spacewatch ||  || align=right data-sort-value="0.90" | 900 m || 
|-id=248 bgcolor=#fefefe
| 551248 ||  || — || May 26, 2011 || Nogales || M. Schwartz, P. R. Holvorcem || H || align=right data-sort-value="0.76" | 760 m || 
|-id=249 bgcolor=#fefefe
| 551249 ||  || — || January 5, 2013 || Mount Lemmon || Mount Lemmon Survey ||  || align=right data-sort-value="0.62" | 620 m || 
|-id=250 bgcolor=#fefefe
| 551250 ||  || — || December 2, 2005 || Mauna Kea || Mauna Kea Obs. ||  || align=right data-sort-value="0.98" | 980 m || 
|-id=251 bgcolor=#E9E9E9
| 551251 ||  || — || September 14, 2007 || Kitt Peak || Spacewatch ||  || align=right | 1.3 km || 
|-id=252 bgcolor=#fefefe
| 551252 ||  || — || January 6, 2013 || Kitt Peak || Spacewatch ||  || align=right data-sort-value="0.62" | 620 m || 
|-id=253 bgcolor=#fefefe
| 551253 ||  || — || April 26, 2006 || Cerro Tololo || Cerro Tololo Obs. || NYS || align=right data-sort-value="0.72" | 720 m || 
|-id=254 bgcolor=#fefefe
| 551254 ||  || — || March 6, 2002 || Siding Spring || R. H. McNaught || MAS || align=right data-sort-value="0.78" | 780 m || 
|-id=255 bgcolor=#d6d6d6
| 551255 ||  || — || January 10, 2013 || Haleakala || Pan-STARRS || Tj (2.68) || align=right | 4.0 km || 
|-id=256 bgcolor=#fefefe
| 551256 ||  || — || December 9, 2012 || Piszkesteto || K. Sárneczky ||  || align=right | 1.2 km || 
|-id=257 bgcolor=#E9E9E9
| 551257 ||  || — || June 4, 2011 || Kitt Peak || Spacewatch || HNS || align=right | 1.7 km || 
|-id=258 bgcolor=#fefefe
| 551258 ||  || — || January 6, 2013 || Mount Lemmon || Mount Lemmon Survey ||  || align=right | 1.1 km || 
|-id=259 bgcolor=#fefefe
| 551259 ||  || — || December 11, 2012 || Nogales || M. Schwartz, P. R. Holvorcem || H || align=right data-sort-value="0.71" | 710 m || 
|-id=260 bgcolor=#fefefe
| 551260 ||  || — || October 22, 2008 || Kitt Peak || Spacewatch ||  || align=right | 1.1 km || 
|-id=261 bgcolor=#E9E9E9
| 551261 ||  || — || September 4, 2011 || Haleakala || Pan-STARRS || DOR || align=right | 2.4 km || 
|-id=262 bgcolor=#C2FFFF
| 551262 ||  || — || December 23, 2012 || Haleakala || Pan-STARRS || L4 || align=right | 7.8 km || 
|-id=263 bgcolor=#fefefe
| 551263 ||  || — || January 11, 2013 || Haleakala || Pan-STARRS || H || align=right data-sort-value="0.62" | 620 m || 
|-id=264 bgcolor=#E9E9E9
| 551264 ||  || — || July 25, 2006 || Mount Lemmon || Mount Lemmon Survey ||  || align=right | 2.2 km || 
|-id=265 bgcolor=#fefefe
| 551265 ||  || — || December 8, 1996 || Kitt Peak || Spacewatch ||  || align=right | 1.2 km || 
|-id=266 bgcolor=#fefefe
| 551266 ||  || — || November 15, 2012 || Charleston || R. Holmes || H || align=right data-sort-value="0.51" | 510 m || 
|-id=267 bgcolor=#fefefe
| 551267 ||  || — || January 7, 2013 || Kitt Peak || Spacewatch ||  || align=right data-sort-value="0.75" | 750 m || 
|-id=268 bgcolor=#FA8072
| 551268 ||  || — || January 14, 2013 || Catalina || CSS ||  || align=right data-sort-value="0.52" | 520 m || 
|-id=269 bgcolor=#E9E9E9
| 551269 ||  || — || November 9, 1999 || Socorro || LINEAR ||  || align=right | 1.2 km || 
|-id=270 bgcolor=#E9E9E9
| 551270 ||  || — || August 28, 2006 || Catalina || CSS ||  || align=right | 2.3 km || 
|-id=271 bgcolor=#E9E9E9
| 551271 ||  || — || November 15, 2012 || Mount Lemmon || Mount Lemmon Survey ||  || align=right | 1.4 km || 
|-id=272 bgcolor=#fefefe
| 551272 ||  || — || February 21, 2006 || Mount Lemmon || Mount Lemmon Survey ||  || align=right data-sort-value="0.86" | 860 m || 
|-id=273 bgcolor=#fefefe
| 551273 ||  || — || February 24, 2003 || Campo Imperatore || CINEOS ||  || align=right data-sort-value="0.95" | 950 m || 
|-id=274 bgcolor=#E9E9E9
| 551274 ||  || — || November 4, 2007 || Kitt Peak || Spacewatch ||  || align=right | 1.8 km || 
|-id=275 bgcolor=#fefefe
| 551275 ||  || — || January 4, 2013 || Kitt Peak || Spacewatch || H || align=right data-sort-value="0.52" | 520 m || 
|-id=276 bgcolor=#C2FFFF
| 551276 ||  || — || October 13, 2010 || Mount Lemmon || Mount Lemmon Survey || L4 || align=right | 6.6 km || 
|-id=277 bgcolor=#fefefe
| 551277 ||  || — || April 8, 2006 || Kitt Peak || Spacewatch ||  || align=right data-sort-value="0.71" | 710 m || 
|-id=278 bgcolor=#fefefe
| 551278 ||  || — || October 23, 2008 || Kitt Peak || Spacewatch ||  || align=right data-sort-value="0.75" | 750 m || 
|-id=279 bgcolor=#C2FFFF
| 551279 ||  || — || November 1, 2010 || Mount Lemmon || Mount Lemmon Survey || L4 || align=right | 13 km || 
|-id=280 bgcolor=#E9E9E9
| 551280 ||  || — || April 30, 1998 || Kitt Peak || Spacewatch ||  || align=right | 1.6 km || 
|-id=281 bgcolor=#fefefe
| 551281 ||  || — || July 24, 2007 || Lulin || LUSS ||  || align=right | 1.2 km || 
|-id=282 bgcolor=#fefefe
| 551282 ||  || — || November 10, 2004 || Kitt Peak || M. W. Buie, L. H. Wasserman || MAS || align=right data-sort-value="0.90" | 900 m || 
|-id=283 bgcolor=#fefefe
| 551283 ||  || — || April 20, 2006 || Kitt Peak || Spacewatch ||  || align=right | 1.1 km || 
|-id=284 bgcolor=#fefefe
| 551284 ||  || — || January 9, 2013 || Kitt Peak || Spacewatch ||  || align=right data-sort-value="0.86" | 860 m || 
|-id=285 bgcolor=#fefefe
| 551285 ||  || — || February 9, 2008 || Catalina || CSS || H || align=right data-sort-value="0.68" | 680 m || 
|-id=286 bgcolor=#fefefe
| 551286 ||  || — || January 10, 2013 || Haleakala || Pan-STARRS ||  || align=right data-sort-value="0.78" | 780 m || 
|-id=287 bgcolor=#E9E9E9
| 551287 ||  || — || January 5, 2013 || Mount Lemmon || Mount Lemmon Survey ||  || align=right | 1.2 km || 
|-id=288 bgcolor=#E9E9E9
| 551288 ||  || — || November 24, 2012 || Nogales || M. Schwartz, P. R. Holvorcem || (1547) || align=right | 1.7 km || 
|-id=289 bgcolor=#d6d6d6
| 551289 ||  || — || February 1, 2003 || Palomar || NEAT ||  || align=right | 4.1 km || 
|-id=290 bgcolor=#d6d6d6
| 551290 ||  || — || September 19, 1998 || Apache Point || SDSS Collaboration || 7:4 || align=right | 3.9 km || 
|-id=291 bgcolor=#fefefe
| 551291 ||  || — || October 1, 2000 || Socorro || LINEAR || V || align=right | 1.0 km || 
|-id=292 bgcolor=#fefefe
| 551292 ||  || — || January 10, 2013 || Haleakala || Pan-STARRS ||  || align=right data-sort-value="0.71" | 710 m || 
|-id=293 bgcolor=#E9E9E9
| 551293 ||  || — || September 13, 2007 || Catalina || CSS || JUN || align=right data-sort-value="0.90" | 900 m || 
|-id=294 bgcolor=#E9E9E9
| 551294 ||  || — || September 7, 2011 || Kitt Peak || Spacewatch ||  || align=right | 1.8 km || 
|-id=295 bgcolor=#FA8072
| 551295 ||  || — || September 7, 2004 || Socorro || LINEAR ||  || align=right | 2.1 km || 
|-id=296 bgcolor=#fefefe
| 551296 ||  || — || January 13, 2013 || ESA OGS || ESA OGS ||  || align=right data-sort-value="0.78" | 780 m || 
|-id=297 bgcolor=#fefefe
| 551297 ||  || — || January 5, 2013 || Mount Lemmon || Mount Lemmon Survey ||  || align=right data-sort-value="0.98" | 980 m || 
|-id=298 bgcolor=#fefefe
| 551298 ||  || — || January 13, 2013 || Catalina || CSS ||  || align=right data-sort-value="0.98" | 980 m || 
|-id=299 bgcolor=#fefefe
| 551299 ||  || — || January 14, 2013 || Mount Lemmon || Mount Lemmon Survey || H || align=right data-sort-value="0.59" | 590 m || 
|-id=300 bgcolor=#E9E9E9
| 551300 ||  || — || December 9, 2012 || Mount Lemmon || Mount Lemmon Survey ||  || align=right | 2.5 km || 
|}

551301–551400 

|-bgcolor=#C2FFFF
| 551301 ||  || — || January 10, 2013 || Haleakala || Pan-STARRS || L4 || align=right | 8.8 km || 
|-id=302 bgcolor=#C2FFFF
| 551302 ||  || — || January 6, 2013 || Kitt Peak || Spacewatch || L4 || align=right | 8.4 km || 
|-id=303 bgcolor=#C2FFFF
| 551303 ||  || — || September 7, 2008 || Mount Lemmon || Mount Lemmon Survey || L4 || align=right | 7.8 km || 
|-id=304 bgcolor=#C2FFFF
| 551304 ||  || — || March 12, 2002 || Palomar || NEAT || L4 || align=right | 12 km || 
|-id=305 bgcolor=#d6d6d6
| 551305 ||  || — || January 11, 2008 || Kitt Peak || Spacewatch ||  || align=right | 2.4 km || 
|-id=306 bgcolor=#fefefe
| 551306 ||  || — || February 10, 2013 || Haleakala || Pan-STARRS || H || align=right data-sort-value="0.59" | 590 m || 
|-id=307 bgcolor=#fefefe
| 551307 ||  || — || January 4, 2013 || Cerro Tololo-DECam || CTIO-DECam ||  || align=right data-sort-value="0.71" | 710 m || 
|-id=308 bgcolor=#fefefe
| 551308 ||  || — || January 20, 2013 || Mount Lemmon || Mount Lemmon Survey ||  || align=right data-sort-value="0.90" | 900 m || 
|-id=309 bgcolor=#E9E9E9
| 551309 ||  || — || January 4, 2013 || Cerro Tololo-DECam || CTIO-DECam ||  || align=right | 2.0 km || 
|-id=310 bgcolor=#fefefe
| 551310 ||  || — || January 20, 2013 || Mount Lemmon || Mount Lemmon Survey ||  || align=right data-sort-value="0.90" | 900 m || 
|-id=311 bgcolor=#fefefe
| 551311 ||  || — || January 20, 2013 || Mount Lemmon || Mount Lemmon Survey ||  || align=right data-sort-value="0.68" | 680 m || 
|-id=312 bgcolor=#fefefe
| 551312 ||  || — || April 6, 2010 || Kitt Peak || Spacewatch ||  || align=right data-sort-value="0.76" | 760 m || 
|-id=313 bgcolor=#d6d6d6
| 551313 ||  || — || January 12, 2008 || Mount Lemmon || Mount Lemmon Survey || 7:4 || align=right | 4.2 km || 
|-id=314 bgcolor=#E9E9E9
| 551314 ||  || — || May 30, 2015 || Mount Lemmon || Mount Lemmon Survey ||  || align=right | 2.6 km || 
|-id=315 bgcolor=#E9E9E9
| 551315 ||  || — || January 8, 2013 || Mount Lemmon || Mount Lemmon Survey ||  || align=right data-sort-value="0.98" | 980 m || 
|-id=316 bgcolor=#E9E9E9
| 551316 ||  || — || January 9, 2013 || Kitt Peak || Spacewatch ||  || align=right data-sort-value="0.90" | 900 m || 
|-id=317 bgcolor=#fefefe
| 551317 ||  || — || July 24, 2015 || Haleakala || Pan-STARRS ||  || align=right data-sort-value="0.71" | 710 m || 
|-id=318 bgcolor=#E9E9E9
| 551318 ||  || — || April 5, 2014 || Haleakala || Pan-STARRS ||  || align=right | 1.6 km || 
|-id=319 bgcolor=#E9E9E9
| 551319 ||  || — || September 11, 2016 || Mount Lemmon || Mount Lemmon Survey ||  || align=right | 1.1 km || 
|-id=320 bgcolor=#C2FFFF
| 551320 ||  || — || December 22, 2012 || Haleakala || Pan-STARRS || L4 || align=right | 8.3 km || 
|-id=321 bgcolor=#C2FFFF
| 551321 ||  || — || September 27, 2012 || Haleakala || Pan-STARRS || L4 || align=right | 7.7 km || 
|-id=322 bgcolor=#C2FFFF
| 551322 ||  || — || December 8, 2012 || Kitt Peak || Spacewatch || L4 || align=right | 8.6 km || 
|-id=323 bgcolor=#fefefe
| 551323 ||  || — || January 16, 2013 || Mount Lemmon || Mount Lemmon Survey ||  || align=right data-sort-value="0.71" | 710 m || 
|-id=324 bgcolor=#E9E9E9
| 551324 ||  || — || September 8, 2011 || Kitt Peak || Spacewatch ||  || align=right | 1.8 km || 
|-id=325 bgcolor=#fefefe
| 551325 ||  || — || September 28, 2000 || Kitt Peak || Spacewatch ||  || align=right data-sort-value="0.82" | 820 m || 
|-id=326 bgcolor=#fefefe
| 551326 ||  || — || January 16, 2013 || Haleakala || Pan-STARRS ||  || align=right data-sort-value="0.82" | 820 m || 
|-id=327 bgcolor=#fefefe
| 551327 ||  || — || December 23, 2012 || Haleakala || Pan-STARRS ||  || align=right data-sort-value="0.86" | 860 m || 
|-id=328 bgcolor=#E9E9E9
| 551328 ||  || — || January 25, 2009 || Kitt Peak || Spacewatch ||  || align=right | 1.0 km || 
|-id=329 bgcolor=#fefefe
| 551329 ||  || — || July 18, 2007 || Mount Lemmon || Mount Lemmon Survey ||  || align=right | 1.1 km || 
|-id=330 bgcolor=#fefefe
| 551330 ||  || — || January 16, 2013 || ASC-Kislovodsk || ASC-Kislovodsk || H || align=right data-sort-value="0.78" | 780 m || 
|-id=331 bgcolor=#fefefe
| 551331 ||  || — || May 19, 2005 || Catalina || CSS || H || align=right | 1.1 km || 
|-id=332 bgcolor=#C2FFFF
| 551332 ||  || — || January 16, 2013 || Mount Lemmon || Mount Lemmon Survey || L4 || align=right | 9.2 km || 
|-id=333 bgcolor=#E9E9E9
| 551333 ||  || — || September 18, 2003 || Kitt Peak || Spacewatch ||  || align=right | 1.2 km || 
|-id=334 bgcolor=#E9E9E9
| 551334 ||  || — || December 23, 2012 || Haleakala || Pan-STARRS ||  || align=right | 2.3 km || 
|-id=335 bgcolor=#fefefe
| 551335 ||  || — || April 13, 2002 || Palomar || NEAT ||  || align=right data-sort-value="0.86" | 860 m || 
|-id=336 bgcolor=#E9E9E9
| 551336 ||  || — || September 20, 2011 || Kitt Peak || Spacewatch ||  || align=right | 2.2 km || 
|-id=337 bgcolor=#fefefe
| 551337 ||  || — || December 1, 2008 || Kitt Peak || Spacewatch ||  || align=right data-sort-value="0.75" | 750 m || 
|-id=338 bgcolor=#fefefe
| 551338 ||  || — || May 24, 2011 || Haleakala || Pan-STARRS || H || align=right data-sort-value="0.71" | 710 m || 
|-id=339 bgcolor=#E9E9E9
| 551339 ||  || — || January 16, 2013 || ESA OGS || ESA OGS ||  || align=right | 1.5 km || 
|-id=340 bgcolor=#C2FFFF
| 551340 ||  || — || October 17, 2010 || Mount Lemmon || Mount Lemmon Survey || L4ERY || align=right | 7.2 km || 
|-id=341 bgcolor=#fefefe
| 551341 ||  || — || July 28, 2011 || Haleakala || Pan-STARRS ||  || align=right data-sort-value="0.75" | 750 m || 
|-id=342 bgcolor=#fefefe
| 551342 ||  || — || January 5, 2013 || Mount Lemmon || Mount Lemmon Survey ||  || align=right data-sort-value="0.86" | 860 m || 
|-id=343 bgcolor=#E9E9E9
| 551343 ||  || — || March 10, 2005 || Anderson Mesa || LONEOS ||  || align=right | 1.4 km || 
|-id=344 bgcolor=#E9E9E9
| 551344 ||  || — || September 26, 2011 || Haleakala || Pan-STARRS ||  || align=right | 2.1 km || 
|-id=345 bgcolor=#E9E9E9
| 551345 ||  || — || January 19, 2013 || Mount Lemmon || Mount Lemmon Survey ||  || align=right data-sort-value="0.90" | 900 m || 
|-id=346 bgcolor=#fefefe
| 551346 ||  || — || January 13, 2013 || Catalina || CSS || H || align=right data-sort-value="0.64" | 640 m || 
|-id=347 bgcolor=#E9E9E9
| 551347 ||  || — || January 16, 2013 || Haleakala || Pan-STARRS ||  || align=right | 1.7 km || 
|-id=348 bgcolor=#fefefe
| 551348 ||  || — || August 26, 2000 || Cerro Tololo || R. Millis, L. H. Wasserman ||  || align=right data-sort-value="0.75" | 750 m || 
|-id=349 bgcolor=#d6d6d6
| 551349 ||  || — || October 20, 2011 || Mount Lemmon || Mount Lemmon Survey ||  || align=right | 1.9 km || 
|-id=350 bgcolor=#E9E9E9
| 551350 ||  || — || August 21, 2007 || Siding Spring || SSS ||  || align=right | 1.9 km || 
|-id=351 bgcolor=#d6d6d6
| 551351 ||  || — || September 23, 2011 || Haleakala || Pan-STARRS ||  || align=right | 1.8 km || 
|-id=352 bgcolor=#E9E9E9
| 551352 ||  || — || December 21, 2012 || Mount Lemmon || Mount Lemmon Survey ||  || align=right | 1.6 km || 
|-id=353 bgcolor=#d6d6d6
| 551353 ||  || — || December 10, 2012 || Mount Lemmon || Mount Lemmon Survey ||  || align=right | 2.9 km || 
|-id=354 bgcolor=#fefefe
| 551354 ||  || — || October 4, 2004 || Kitt Peak || Spacewatch ||  || align=right data-sort-value="0.71" | 710 m || 
|-id=355 bgcolor=#fefefe
| 551355 ||  || — || November 4, 2004 || Catalina || CSS ||  || align=right data-sort-value="0.98" | 980 m || 
|-id=356 bgcolor=#fefefe
| 551356 ||  || — || January 21, 2013 || Haleakala || Pan-STARRS || H || align=right data-sort-value="0.68" | 680 m || 
|-id=357 bgcolor=#fefefe
| 551357 ||  || — || January 31, 2013 || Mount Lemmon || Mount Lemmon Survey || H || align=right data-sort-value="0.54" | 540 m || 
|-id=358 bgcolor=#fefefe
| 551358 ||  || — || January 31, 2013 || Haleakala || Pan-STARRS || H || align=right data-sort-value="0.71" | 710 m || 
|-id=359 bgcolor=#fefefe
| 551359 ||  || — || January 5, 2013 || Mount Lemmon || Mount Lemmon Survey ||  || align=right data-sort-value="0.65" | 650 m || 
|-id=360 bgcolor=#fefefe
| 551360 ||  || — || March 12, 2002 || Palomar || NEAT ||  || align=right | 1.0 km || 
|-id=361 bgcolor=#E9E9E9
| 551361 ||  || — || October 1, 2003 || Anderson Mesa || LONEOS ||  || align=right | 1.6 km || 
|-id=362 bgcolor=#fefefe
| 551362 ||  || — || September 27, 2000 || Kitt Peak || Spacewatch || H || align=right data-sort-value="0.71" | 710 m || 
|-id=363 bgcolor=#E9E9E9
| 551363 ||  || — || January 20, 2013 || Kitt Peak || Spacewatch ||  || align=right | 2.0 km || 
|-id=364 bgcolor=#d6d6d6
| 551364 ||  || — || January 18, 2013 || Kitt Peak || Spacewatch ||  || align=right | 2.2 km || 
|-id=365 bgcolor=#E9E9E9
| 551365 ||  || — || January 17, 2013 || Mount Lemmon || Mount Lemmon Survey ||  || align=right data-sort-value="0.78" | 780 m || 
|-id=366 bgcolor=#E9E9E9
| 551366 ||  || — || January 17, 2013 || Haleakala || Pan-STARRS ||  || align=right | 1.8 km || 
|-id=367 bgcolor=#fefefe
| 551367 ||  || — || November 20, 2009 || Kitt Peak || Spacewatch || H || align=right data-sort-value="0.60" | 600 m || 
|-id=368 bgcolor=#E9E9E9
| 551368 ||  || — || August 31, 2011 || Haleakala || Pan-STARRS ||  || align=right | 1.8 km || 
|-id=369 bgcolor=#fefefe
| 551369 ||  || — || January 5, 2013 || Calar Alto-CASADO || S. Mottola ||  || align=right data-sort-value="0.74" | 740 m || 
|-id=370 bgcolor=#fefefe
| 551370 ||  || — || December 23, 2012 || Haleakala || Pan-STARRS ||  || align=right data-sort-value="0.75" | 750 m || 
|-id=371 bgcolor=#E9E9E9
| 551371 ||  || — || November 8, 2007 || BlackBird || K. Levin ||  || align=right | 1.1 km || 
|-id=372 bgcolor=#FA8072
| 551372 ||  || — || January 19, 2013 || Mount Lemmon || Mount Lemmon Survey || H || align=right data-sort-value="0.56" | 560 m || 
|-id=373 bgcolor=#fefefe
| 551373 ||  || — || February 2, 2013 || Kitt Peak || Spacewatch || H || align=right data-sort-value="0.57" | 570 m || 
|-id=374 bgcolor=#E9E9E9
| 551374 ||  || — || August 16, 2006 || Palomar || NEAT || AGN || align=right | 1.5 km || 
|-id=375 bgcolor=#E9E9E9
| 551375 ||  || — || February 4, 2009 || Mount Lemmon || Mount Lemmon Survey ||  || align=right data-sort-value="0.86" | 860 m || 
|-id=376 bgcolor=#fefefe
| 551376 ||  || — || January 3, 2013 || Mount Lemmon || Mount Lemmon Survey ||  || align=right | 1.0 km || 
|-id=377 bgcolor=#E9E9E9
| 551377 ||  || — || March 15, 2004 || Kitt Peak || Spacewatch || AGN || align=right | 1.1 km || 
|-id=378 bgcolor=#fefefe
| 551378 ||  || — || December 27, 1997 || Flagstaff || B. A. Skiff ||  || align=right data-sort-value="0.86" | 860 m || 
|-id=379 bgcolor=#fefefe
| 551379 ||  || — || July 28, 2011 || Haleakala || Pan-STARRS || H || align=right data-sort-value="0.78" | 780 m || 
|-id=380 bgcolor=#fefefe
| 551380 ||  || — || February 8, 2013 || Haleakala || Pan-STARRS || H || align=right data-sort-value="0.75" | 750 m || 
|-id=381 bgcolor=#fefefe
| 551381 ||  || — || May 1, 2003 || Apache Point || SDSS Collaboration || H || align=right data-sort-value="0.65" | 650 m || 
|-id=382 bgcolor=#E9E9E9
| 551382 ||  || — || February 3, 2013 || Elena Remote || A. Oreshko ||  || align=right | 1.1 km || 
|-id=383 bgcolor=#fefefe
| 551383 ||  || — || February 5, 2013 || Mount Lemmon || Mount Lemmon Survey ||  || align=right | 1.0 km || 
|-id=384 bgcolor=#E9E9E9
| 551384 ||  || — || February 5, 2013 || Kitt Peak || Spacewatch ||  || align=right data-sort-value="0.90" | 900 m || 
|-id=385 bgcolor=#d6d6d6
| 551385 ||  || — || March 28, 2008 || Kitt Peak || Spacewatch ||  || align=right | 2.5 km || 
|-id=386 bgcolor=#fefefe
| 551386 ||  || — || February 5, 2013 || Charleston || R. Holmes || H || align=right data-sort-value="0.47" | 470 m || 
|-id=387 bgcolor=#E9E9E9
| 551387 ||  || — || May 16, 2005 || Kitt Peak || Spacewatch ||  || align=right | 1.1 km || 
|-id=388 bgcolor=#E9E9E9
| 551388 ||  || — || February 5, 2000 || Kitt Peak || Kitt Peak Obs. ||  || align=right | 2.3 km || 
|-id=389 bgcolor=#fefefe
| 551389 ||  || — || February 4, 2005 || Palomar || NEAT || H || align=right data-sort-value="0.73" | 730 m || 
|-id=390 bgcolor=#E9E9E9
| 551390 Thomaskeßler ||  ||  || February 6, 2013 || iTelescope || J. Jahn ||  || align=right | 1.8 km || 
|-id=391 bgcolor=#fefefe
| 551391 ||  || — || February 7, 2013 || Oukaimeden || C. Rinner ||  || align=right data-sort-value="0.68" | 680 m || 
|-id=392 bgcolor=#fefefe
| 551392 ||  || — || December 2, 2005 || Kitt Peak || L. H. Wasserman, R. Millis ||  || align=right data-sort-value="0.93" | 930 m || 
|-id=393 bgcolor=#E9E9E9
| 551393 ||  || — || February 9, 2013 || Oukaimeden || C. Rinner ||  || align=right data-sort-value="0.86" | 860 m || 
|-id=394 bgcolor=#fefefe
| 551394 ||  || — || February 2, 2013 || Haleakala || Pan-STARRS || H || align=right data-sort-value="0.59" | 590 m || 
|-id=395 bgcolor=#E9E9E9
| 551395 ||  || — || January 9, 2013 || Mount Lemmon || Mount Lemmon Survey ||  || align=right | 1.0 km || 
|-id=396 bgcolor=#d6d6d6
| 551396 ||  || — || January 8, 2013 || Mount Lemmon || Mount Lemmon Survey ||  || align=right | 2.3 km || 
|-id=397 bgcolor=#E9E9E9
| 551397 ||  || — || December 20, 2012 || Mount Lemmon || Mount Lemmon Survey ||  || align=right | 1.4 km || 
|-id=398 bgcolor=#E9E9E9
| 551398 ||  || — || March 11, 2005 || Mount Lemmon || Mount Lemmon Survey ||  || align=right data-sort-value="0.82" | 820 m || 
|-id=399 bgcolor=#E9E9E9
| 551399 ||  || — || November 2, 2011 || Mount Lemmon || Mount Lemmon Survey ||  || align=right | 2.2 km || 
|-id=400 bgcolor=#fefefe
| 551400 ||  || — || May 8, 2008 || Kitt Peak || Spacewatch || H || align=right data-sort-value="0.54" | 540 m || 
|}

551401–551500 

|-bgcolor=#fefefe
| 551401 ||  || — || February 3, 2013 || Haleakala || Pan-STARRS || H || align=right data-sort-value="0.82" | 820 m || 
|-id=402 bgcolor=#E9E9E9
| 551402 ||  || — || January 20, 2009 || Kitt Peak || Spacewatch || critical || align=right data-sort-value="0.75" | 750 m || 
|-id=403 bgcolor=#E9E9E9
| 551403 ||  || — || January 20, 2013 || Kitt Peak || Spacewatch ||  || align=right data-sort-value="0.78" | 780 m || 
|-id=404 bgcolor=#E9E9E9
| 551404 ||  || — || January 17, 2013 || Mount Lemmon || Mount Lemmon Survey ||  || align=right | 1.4 km || 
|-id=405 bgcolor=#fefefe
| 551405 ||  || — || January 20, 2013 || Kitt Peak || Spacewatch ||  || align=right | 1.1 km || 
|-id=406 bgcolor=#C2FFFF
| 551406 ||  || — || January 9, 2013 || Kitt Peak || Spacewatch || L4 || align=right | 7.3 km || 
|-id=407 bgcolor=#fefefe
| 551407 ||  || — || January 18, 2013 || XuYi || PMO NEO ||  || align=right data-sort-value="0.82" | 820 m || 
|-id=408 bgcolor=#fefefe
| 551408 ||  || — || February 8, 2013 || Haleakala || Pan-STARRS || H || align=right data-sort-value="0.62" | 620 m || 
|-id=409 bgcolor=#fefefe
| 551409 ||  || — || September 23, 2008 || Kitt Peak || Spacewatch ||  || align=right data-sort-value="0.75" | 750 m || 
|-id=410 bgcolor=#fefefe
| 551410 ||  || — || January 16, 2013 || ESA OGS || ESA OGS || H || align=right data-sort-value="0.62" | 620 m || 
|-id=411 bgcolor=#fefefe
| 551411 ||  || — || August 29, 2006 || Catalina || CSS || H || align=right data-sort-value="0.71" | 710 m || 
|-id=412 bgcolor=#d6d6d6
| 551412 ||  || — || February 2, 2008 || Kitt Peak || Spacewatch ||  || align=right | 2.1 km || 
|-id=413 bgcolor=#fefefe
| 551413 ||  || — || March 5, 2006 || Kitt Peak || Spacewatch || V || align=right data-sort-value="0.49" | 490 m || 
|-id=414 bgcolor=#fefefe
| 551414 ||  || — || May 29, 2003 || Apache Point || SDSS Collaboration || H || align=right data-sort-value="0.59" | 590 m || 
|-id=415 bgcolor=#d6d6d6
| 551415 ||  || — || February 8, 2013 || Haleakala || Pan-STARRS ||  || align=right | 1.8 km || 
|-id=416 bgcolor=#d6d6d6
| 551416 ||  || — || September 25, 2005 || Kitt Peak || Spacewatch ||  || align=right | 2.2 km || 
|-id=417 bgcolor=#C2FFFF
| 551417 ||  || — || November 5, 2010 || Mount Lemmon || Mount Lemmon Survey || L4 || align=right | 6.2 km || 
|-id=418 bgcolor=#d6d6d6
| 551418 ||  || — || February 9, 2013 || Haleakala || Pan-STARRS ||  || align=right | 1.9 km || 
|-id=419 bgcolor=#fefefe
| 551419 ||  || — || January 12, 2000 || Kitt Peak || Spacewatch || H || align=right data-sort-value="0.66" | 660 m || 
|-id=420 bgcolor=#fefefe
| 551420 ||  || — || December 21, 2008 || Mount Lemmon || Mount Lemmon Survey ||  || align=right data-sort-value="0.82" | 820 m || 
|-id=421 bgcolor=#fefefe
| 551421 ||  || — || February 2, 2013 || Kitt Peak || Spacewatch ||  || align=right | 1.1 km || 
|-id=422 bgcolor=#d6d6d6
| 551422 ||  || — || January 17, 2013 || Haleakala || Pan-STARRS ||  || align=right | 1.7 km || 
|-id=423 bgcolor=#E9E9E9
| 551423 ||  || — || March 11, 2005 || Kitt Peak || Spacewatch ||  || align=right | 1.2 km || 
|-id=424 bgcolor=#E9E9E9
| 551424 ||  || — || September 3, 2003 || Haleakala || AMOS ||  || align=right | 1.2 km || 
|-id=425 bgcolor=#E9E9E9
| 551425 ||  || — || January 17, 2004 || Palomar || NEAT || HNS || align=right | 1.6 km || 
|-id=426 bgcolor=#E9E9E9
| 551426 ||  || — || February 5, 2013 || Kitt Peak || Spacewatch ||  || align=right data-sort-value="0.98" | 980 m || 
|-id=427 bgcolor=#E9E9E9
| 551427 ||  || — || December 30, 2008 || Mount Lemmon || Mount Lemmon Survey ||  || align=right data-sort-value="0.98" | 980 m || 
|-id=428 bgcolor=#fefefe
| 551428 ||  || — || March 11, 2002 || Palomar || NEAT || H || align=right data-sort-value="0.94" | 940 m || 
|-id=429 bgcolor=#fefefe
| 551429 ||  || — || February 14, 2013 || Haleakala || Pan-STARRS || H || align=right data-sort-value="0.68" | 680 m || 
|-id=430 bgcolor=#E9E9E9
| 551430 ||  || — || February 5, 2013 || Catalina || CSS || EUN || align=right | 1.2 km || 
|-id=431 bgcolor=#E9E9E9
| 551431 ||  || — || March 26, 2001 || Kitt Peak || Spacewatch ||  || align=right | 1.6 km || 
|-id=432 bgcolor=#fefefe
| 551432 ||  || — || February 11, 2013 || Catalina || CSS || H || align=right data-sort-value="0.65" | 650 m || 
|-id=433 bgcolor=#FA8072
| 551433 ||  || — || February 15, 2013 || ASC-Kislovodsk || ASC-Kislovodsk || H || align=right data-sort-value="0.74" | 740 m || 
|-id=434 bgcolor=#fefefe
| 551434 ||  || — || January 17, 2013 || Catalina || CSS ||  || align=right | 1.1 km || 
|-id=435 bgcolor=#fefefe
| 551435 ||  || — || February 2, 2005 || Socorro || LINEAR || H || align=right data-sort-value="0.59" | 590 m || 
|-id=436 bgcolor=#E9E9E9
| 551436 ||  || — || January 9, 2013 || Mount Lemmon || Mount Lemmon Survey || EUN || align=right | 1.2 km || 
|-id=437 bgcolor=#d6d6d6
| 551437 ||  || — || February 5, 2013 || Kitt Peak || Spacewatch ||  || align=right | 2.5 km || 
|-id=438 bgcolor=#fefefe
| 551438 ||  || — || October 24, 2011 || Mount Lemmon || Mount Lemmon Survey ||  || align=right data-sort-value="0.75" | 750 m || 
|-id=439 bgcolor=#fefefe
| 551439 ||  || — || February 2, 2009 || Kitt Peak || Spacewatch ||  || align=right data-sort-value="0.62" | 620 m || 
|-id=440 bgcolor=#E9E9E9
| 551440 ||  || — || March 10, 2005 || Kitt Peak || M. W. Buie, L. H. Wasserman ||  || align=right data-sort-value="0.65" | 650 m || 
|-id=441 bgcolor=#E9E9E9
| 551441 ||  || — || January 17, 2005 || Kitt Peak || Spacewatch ||  || align=right data-sort-value="0.94" | 940 m || 
|-id=442 bgcolor=#E9E9E9
| 551442 ||  || — || February 14, 2013 || Kitt Peak || Spacewatch || EUN || align=right | 1.3 km || 
|-id=443 bgcolor=#E9E9E9
| 551443 ||  || — || March 16, 2005 || Kitt Peak || Spacewatch ||  || align=right data-sort-value="0.78" | 780 m || 
|-id=444 bgcolor=#E9E9E9
| 551444 ||  || — || February 14, 2013 || Haleakala || Pan-STARRS || (5) || align=right data-sort-value="0.85" | 850 m || 
|-id=445 bgcolor=#d6d6d6
| 551445 ||  || — || February 14, 2013 || Mount Lemmon || Mount Lemmon Survey ||  || align=right | 2.7 km || 
|-id=446 bgcolor=#fefefe
| 551446 ||  || — || December 29, 2008 || Mount Lemmon || Mount Lemmon Survey || MAS || align=right data-sort-value="0.61" | 610 m || 
|-id=447 bgcolor=#E9E9E9
| 551447 ||  || — || February 26, 2009 || Kitt Peak || Spacewatch || MAR || align=right data-sort-value="0.92" | 920 m || 
|-id=448 bgcolor=#fefefe
| 551448 ||  || — || April 15, 2002 || Palomar || NEAT || V || align=right data-sort-value="0.85" | 850 m || 
|-id=449 bgcolor=#E9E9E9
| 551449 ||  || — || October 11, 2002 || Palomar || NEAT ||  || align=right | 2.6 km || 
|-id=450 bgcolor=#fefefe
| 551450 ||  || — || November 3, 2004 || Palomar || NEAT ||  || align=right | 1.5 km || 
|-id=451 bgcolor=#fefefe
| 551451 ||  || — || September 4, 2011 || Haleakala || Pan-STARRS ||  || align=right data-sort-value="0.90" | 900 m || 
|-id=452 bgcolor=#E9E9E9
| 551452 ||  || — || August 18, 2006 || Palomar || NEAT ||  || align=right | 2.1 km || 
|-id=453 bgcolor=#E9E9E9
| 551453 ||  || — || November 3, 2007 || Mount Lemmon || Mount Lemmon Survey ||  || align=right | 1.4 km || 
|-id=454 bgcolor=#E9E9E9
| 551454 ||  || — || January 14, 2013 || Mount Lemmon || Mount Lemmon Survey ||  || align=right | 1.0 km || 
|-id=455 bgcolor=#fefefe
| 551455 ||  || — || February 5, 2013 || Kitt Peak || Spacewatch ||  || align=right data-sort-value="0.69" | 690 m || 
|-id=456 bgcolor=#fefefe
| 551456 ||  || — || January 20, 2013 || Kitt Peak || Spacewatch ||  || align=right data-sort-value="0.68" | 680 m || 
|-id=457 bgcolor=#fefefe
| 551457 ||  || — || January 16, 2013 || Haleakala || Pan-STARRS ||  || align=right data-sort-value="0.71" | 710 m || 
|-id=458 bgcolor=#d6d6d6
| 551458 ||  || — || January 16, 2013 || Haleakala || Pan-STARRS ||  || align=right | 1.6 km || 
|-id=459 bgcolor=#fefefe
| 551459 ||  || — || February 25, 2000 || Kitt Peak || Spacewatch || H || align=right data-sort-value="0.57" | 570 m || 
|-id=460 bgcolor=#fefefe
| 551460 ||  || — || February 14, 2013 || ESA OGS || ESA OGS || H || align=right data-sort-value="0.57" | 570 m || 
|-id=461 bgcolor=#E9E9E9
| 551461 ||  || — || February 19, 2009 || Kitt Peak || Spacewatch ||  || align=right data-sort-value="0.78" | 780 m || 
|-id=462 bgcolor=#E9E9E9
| 551462 ||  || — || February 19, 2009 || Mount Lemmon || Mount Lemmon Survey ||  || align=right data-sort-value="0.78" | 780 m || 
|-id=463 bgcolor=#E9E9E9
| 551463 ||  || — || February 15, 2013 || Haleakala || Pan-STARRS ||  || align=right | 2.2 km || 
|-id=464 bgcolor=#fefefe
| 551464 ||  || — || January 16, 2009 || Mount Lemmon || Mount Lemmon Survey ||  || align=right data-sort-value="0.70" | 700 m || 
|-id=465 bgcolor=#E9E9E9
| 551465 ||  || — || May 23, 2014 || Haleakala || Pan-STARRS ||  || align=right | 1.6 km || 
|-id=466 bgcolor=#fefefe
| 551466 ||  || — || February 13, 2013 || Haleakala || Pan-STARRS ||  || align=right data-sort-value="0.82" | 820 m || 
|-id=467 bgcolor=#E9E9E9
| 551467 ||  || — || February 13, 2013 || Haleakala || Pan-STARRS ||  || align=right data-sort-value="0.90" | 900 m || 
|-id=468 bgcolor=#fefefe
| 551468 ||  || — || February 15, 2013 || Haleakala || Pan-STARRS ||  || align=right data-sort-value="0.78" | 780 m || 
|-id=469 bgcolor=#E9E9E9
| 551469 ||  || — || February 9, 2013 || Haleakala || Pan-STARRS ||  || align=right | 1.8 km || 
|-id=470 bgcolor=#d6d6d6
| 551470 ||  || — || March 6, 2008 || Catalina || CSS ||  || align=right | 2.8 km || 
|-id=471 bgcolor=#fefefe
| 551471 ||  || — || December 29, 2008 || Kitt Peak || Spacewatch ||  || align=right data-sort-value="0.59" | 590 m || 
|-id=472 bgcolor=#E9E9E9
| 551472 ||  || — || February 16, 2013 || Kitt Peak || Spacewatch ||  || align=right | 2.0 km || 
|-id=473 bgcolor=#d6d6d6
| 551473 ||  || — || October 26, 2011 || Haleakala || Pan-STARRS ||  || align=right | 1.7 km || 
|-id=474 bgcolor=#E9E9E9
| 551474 ||  || — || April 14, 2005 || Kitt Peak || Spacewatch ||  || align=right | 1.0 km || 
|-id=475 bgcolor=#fefefe
| 551475 ||  || — || February 9, 2013 || Haleakala || Pan-STARRS || H || align=right data-sort-value="0.62" | 620 m || 
|-id=476 bgcolor=#d6d6d6
| 551476 ||  || — || January 10, 2007 || Kitt Peak || Spacewatch || TIR || align=right | 2.6 km || 
|-id=477 bgcolor=#d6d6d6
| 551477 ||  || — || February 17, 2013 || Mount Lemmon || Mount Lemmon Survey ||  || align=right | 2.5 km || 
|-id=478 bgcolor=#E9E9E9
| 551478 ||  || — || February 17, 2013 || Mount Lemmon || Mount Lemmon Survey ||  || align=right | 1.2 km || 
|-id=479 bgcolor=#E9E9E9
| 551479 ||  || — || February 17, 2013 || Catalina || CSS ||  || align=right | 1.1 km || 
|-id=480 bgcolor=#E9E9E9
| 551480 ||  || — || May 4, 2005 || Kitt Peak || Kitt Peak Obs. ||  || align=right | 2.0 km || 
|-id=481 bgcolor=#d6d6d6
| 551481 ||  || — || October 1, 2005 || Mount Lemmon || Mount Lemmon Survey ||  || align=right | 2.2 km || 
|-id=482 bgcolor=#fefefe
| 551482 ||  || — || February 20, 2013 || Charleston || R. Holmes || H || align=right data-sort-value="0.68" | 680 m || 
|-id=483 bgcolor=#d6d6d6
| 551483 ||  || — || June 6, 2014 || Haleakala || Pan-STARRS ||  || align=right | 2.0 km || 
|-id=484 bgcolor=#E9E9E9
| 551484 ||  || — || February 21, 2013 || Haleakala || Pan-STARRS ||  || align=right data-sort-value="0.78" | 780 m || 
|-id=485 bgcolor=#E9E9E9
| 551485 ||  || — || October 23, 2003 || Apache Point || SDSS Collaboration ||  || align=right | 1.1 km || 
|-id=486 bgcolor=#d6d6d6
| 551486 ||  || — || February 11, 2013 || ESA OGS || ESA OGS ||  || align=right | 2.3 km || 
|-id=487 bgcolor=#fefefe
| 551487 ||  || — || February 15, 2013 || Haleakala || Pan-STARRS || H || align=right data-sort-value="0.55" | 550 m || 
|-id=488 bgcolor=#fefefe
| 551488 ||  || — || October 4, 2006 || Mount Lemmon || Mount Lemmon Survey || H || align=right data-sort-value="0.54" | 540 m || 
|-id=489 bgcolor=#d6d6d6
| 551489 ||  || — || October 25, 2011 || Haleakala || Pan-STARRS ||  || align=right | 2.2 km || 
|-id=490 bgcolor=#fefefe
| 551490 ||  || — || March 6, 2013 || Haleakala || Pan-STARRS || H || align=right data-sort-value="0.75" | 750 m || 
|-id=491 bgcolor=#E9E9E9
| 551491 ||  || — || October 26, 2011 || Haleakala || Pan-STARRS ||  || align=right data-sort-value="0.98" | 980 m || 
|-id=492 bgcolor=#E9E9E9
| 551492 ||  || — || August 23, 2003 || Palomar || NEAT ||  || align=right data-sort-value="0.98" | 980 m || 
|-id=493 bgcolor=#E9E9E9
| 551493 ||  || — || February 18, 2013 || Kitt Peak || Spacewatch ||  || align=right data-sort-value="0.98" | 980 m || 
|-id=494 bgcolor=#E9E9E9
| 551494 ||  || — || March 6, 2013 || Haleakala || Pan-STARRS ||  || align=right data-sort-value="0.86" | 860 m || 
|-id=495 bgcolor=#E9E9E9
| 551495 ||  || — || October 20, 2003 || Palomar || NEAT ||  || align=right data-sort-value="0.82" | 820 m || 
|-id=496 bgcolor=#E9E9E9
| 551496 ||  || — || March 7, 2013 || Mount Lemmon || Mount Lemmon Survey ||  || align=right data-sort-value="0.94" | 940 m || 
|-id=497 bgcolor=#FA8072
| 551497 ||  || — || March 7, 2013 || Haleakala || Pan-STARRS ||  || align=right | 1.2 km || 
|-id=498 bgcolor=#E9E9E9
| 551498 ||  || — || March 3, 2013 || Haleakala || Pan-STARRS ||  || align=right data-sort-value="0.86" | 860 m || 
|-id=499 bgcolor=#E9E9E9
| 551499 ||  || — || October 27, 2003 || Anderson Mesa || LONEOS ||  || align=right | 1.3 km || 
|-id=500 bgcolor=#E9E9E9
| 551500 ||  || — || February 11, 2013 || Nogales || M. Schwartz, P. R. Holvorcem ||  || align=right | 1.4 km || 
|}

551501–551600 

|-bgcolor=#fefefe
| 551501 ||  || — || March 6, 2013 || Nogales || M. Schwartz, P. R. Holvorcem ||  || align=right data-sort-value="0.89" | 890 m || 
|-id=502 bgcolor=#fefefe
| 551502 ||  || — || March 5, 2013 || Mount Lemmon || Mount Lemmon Survey ||  || align=right data-sort-value="0.52" | 520 m || 
|-id=503 bgcolor=#E9E9E9
| 551503 ||  || — || March 8, 2013 || Haleakala || Pan-STARRS ||  || align=right data-sort-value="0.98" | 980 m || 
|-id=504 bgcolor=#fefefe
| 551504 ||  || — || September 20, 2003 || Palomar || NEAT || H || align=right data-sort-value="0.71" | 710 m || 
|-id=505 bgcolor=#E9E9E9
| 551505 ||  || — || December 1, 2008 || Mount Lemmon || Mount Lemmon Survey ||  || align=right data-sort-value="0.98" | 980 m || 
|-id=506 bgcolor=#E9E9E9
| 551506 ||  || — || January 10, 2013 || Mount Lemmon || Mount Lemmon Survey ||  || align=right | 1.3 km || 
|-id=507 bgcolor=#d6d6d6
| 551507 ||  || — || November 14, 2006 || Kitt Peak || Spacewatch ||  || align=right | 2.0 km || 
|-id=508 bgcolor=#d6d6d6
| 551508 ||  || — || March 6, 2013 || Haleakala || Pan-STARRS ||  || align=right | 2.3 km || 
|-id=509 bgcolor=#d6d6d6
| 551509 ||  || — || December 14, 2006 || Kitt Peak || Spacewatch ||  || align=right | 2.1 km || 
|-id=510 bgcolor=#d6d6d6
| 551510 ||  || — || March 8, 2013 || Haleakala || Pan-STARRS ||  || align=right | 3.1 km || 
|-id=511 bgcolor=#fefefe
| 551511 ||  || — || September 16, 2006 || Catalina || CSS || H || align=right data-sort-value="0.68" | 680 m || 
|-id=512 bgcolor=#d6d6d6
| 551512 ||  || — || October 11, 2004 || Kitt Peak || L. H. Wasserman, J. R. Lovering || THM || align=right | 2.0 km || 
|-id=513 bgcolor=#E9E9E9
| 551513 ||  || — || November 12, 2007 || Mount Lemmon || Mount Lemmon Survey ||  || align=right data-sort-value="0.82" | 820 m || 
|-id=514 bgcolor=#d6d6d6
| 551514 ||  || — || April 11, 2008 || Mount Lemmon || Mount Lemmon Survey ||  || align=right | 1.8 km || 
|-id=515 bgcolor=#fefefe
| 551515 ||  || — || March 8, 2013 || Haleakala || Pan-STARRS ||  || align=right data-sort-value="0.62" | 620 m || 
|-id=516 bgcolor=#d6d6d6
| 551516 ||  || — || January 18, 2012 || Mount Lemmon || Mount Lemmon Survey || 3:2 || align=right | 3.4 km || 
|-id=517 bgcolor=#E9E9E9
| 551517 ||  || — || February 7, 2013 || ASC-Kislovodsk || ASC-Kislovodsk ||  || align=right data-sort-value="0.98" | 980 m || 
|-id=518 bgcolor=#E9E9E9
| 551518 ||  || — || September 20, 2007 || Kitt Peak || Spacewatch ||  || align=right data-sort-value="0.86" | 860 m || 
|-id=519 bgcolor=#d6d6d6
| 551519 ||  || — || March 3, 2013 || Kitt Peak || Spacewatch ||  || align=right | 2.3 km || 
|-id=520 bgcolor=#E9E9E9
| 551520 ||  || — || March 8, 2013 || Haleakala || Pan-STARRS ||  || align=right | 1.3 km || 
|-id=521 bgcolor=#E9E9E9
| 551521 ||  || — || March 8, 2013 || Haleakala || Pan-STARRS ||  || align=right data-sort-value="0.94" | 940 m || 
|-id=522 bgcolor=#E9E9E9
| 551522 ||  || — || March 8, 2013 || Haleakala || Pan-STARRS ||  || align=right | 1.2 km || 
|-id=523 bgcolor=#E9E9E9
| 551523 ||  || — || September 22, 2003 || Palomar || NEAT ||  || align=right | 1.2 km || 
|-id=524 bgcolor=#E9E9E9
| 551524 ||  || — || March 12, 2013 || Mount Lemmon || Mount Lemmon Survey ||  || align=right data-sort-value="0.71" | 710 m || 
|-id=525 bgcolor=#fefefe
| 551525 ||  || — || March 13, 2013 || Palomar || PTF ||  || align=right | 1.0 km || 
|-id=526 bgcolor=#E9E9E9
| 551526 ||  || — || March 13, 2013 || Palomar || PTF ||  || align=right | 2.9 km || 
|-id=527 bgcolor=#E9E9E9
| 551527 ||  || — || March 6, 2013 || Siding Spring || SSS ||  || align=right | 1.8 km || 
|-id=528 bgcolor=#fefefe
| 551528 ||  || — || August 19, 2001 || Socorro || LINEAR ||  || align=right data-sort-value="0.90" | 900 m || 
|-id=529 bgcolor=#E9E9E9
| 551529 ||  || — || April 21, 2009 || Kitt Peak || Spacewatch ||  || align=right data-sort-value="0.78" | 780 m || 
|-id=530 bgcolor=#E9E9E9
| 551530 ||  || — || March 8, 2013 || Haleakala || Pan-STARRS || MAR || align=right | 1.0 km || 
|-id=531 bgcolor=#d6d6d6
| 551531 ||  || — || February 17, 2013 || Kitt Peak || Spacewatch ||  || align=right | 2.9 km || 
|-id=532 bgcolor=#fefefe
| 551532 ||  || — || March 11, 2013 || Mount Lemmon || Mount Lemmon Survey ||  || align=right data-sort-value="0.78" | 780 m || 
|-id=533 bgcolor=#fefefe
| 551533 ||  || — || March 12, 2013 || Mount Lemmon || Mount Lemmon Survey ||  || align=right data-sort-value="0.52" | 520 m || 
|-id=534 bgcolor=#fefefe
| 551534 ||  || — || August 24, 2011 || Haleakala || Pan-STARRS || H || align=right data-sort-value="0.57" | 570 m || 
|-id=535 bgcolor=#E9E9E9
| 551535 ||  || — || April 1, 2005 || Kitt Peak || Spacewatch ||  || align=right data-sort-value="0.94" | 940 m || 
|-id=536 bgcolor=#E9E9E9
| 551536 ||  || — || March 15, 2013 || Nogales || M. Schwartz, P. R. Holvorcem ||  || align=right | 1.5 km || 
|-id=537 bgcolor=#fefefe
| 551537 ||  || — || February 16, 2013 || Oukaimeden || C. Rinner || H || align=right data-sort-value="0.68" | 680 m || 
|-id=538 bgcolor=#E9E9E9
| 551538 ||  || — || November 11, 2007 || Mount Lemmon || Mount Lemmon Survey ||  || align=right | 2.8 km || 
|-id=539 bgcolor=#fefefe
| 551539 ||  || — || March 10, 2005 || Mount Lemmon || Mount Lemmon Survey || H || align=right data-sort-value="0.57" | 570 m || 
|-id=540 bgcolor=#fefefe
| 551540 ||  || — || March 12, 2013 || Kitt Peak || Spacewatch ||  || align=right data-sort-value="0.78" | 780 m || 
|-id=541 bgcolor=#E9E9E9
| 551541 ||  || — || March 12, 2013 || Kitt Peak || Spacewatch ||  || align=right data-sort-value="0.94" | 940 m || 
|-id=542 bgcolor=#d6d6d6
| 551542 ||  || — || February 25, 2002 || Palomar || NEAT ||  || align=right | 3.2 km || 
|-id=543 bgcolor=#E9E9E9
| 551543 ||  || — || March 4, 2013 || Haleakala || Pan-STARRS ||  || align=right | 1.2 km || 
|-id=544 bgcolor=#d6d6d6
| 551544 ||  || — || March 8, 2003 || Palomar || NEAT ||  || align=right | 4.0 km || 
|-id=545 bgcolor=#E9E9E9
| 551545 ||  || — || March 13, 2013 || Haleakala || Pan-STARRS ||  || align=right | 1.8 km || 
|-id=546 bgcolor=#E9E9E9
| 551546 ||  || — || March 13, 2013 || Haleakala || Pan-STARRS ||  || align=right data-sort-value="0.90" | 900 m || 
|-id=547 bgcolor=#fefefe
| 551547 ||  || — || September 18, 2011 || Mount Lemmon || Mount Lemmon Survey || H || align=right data-sort-value="0.43" | 430 m || 
|-id=548 bgcolor=#E9E9E9
| 551548 ||  || — || July 18, 2006 || Siding Spring || SSS ||  || align=right | 1.3 km || 
|-id=549 bgcolor=#d6d6d6
| 551549 ||  || — || September 25, 2005 || Junk Bond || D. Healy ||  || align=right | 2.3 km || 
|-id=550 bgcolor=#E9E9E9
| 551550 ||  || — || January 14, 2008 || Kitt Peak || Spacewatch ||  || align=right | 1.3 km || 
|-id=551 bgcolor=#E9E9E9
| 551551 ||  || — || November 17, 2011 || Kitt Peak || Spacewatch ||  || align=right data-sort-value="0.94" | 940 m || 
|-id=552 bgcolor=#E9E9E9
| 551552 ||  || — || May 3, 2013 || Haleakala || Pan-STARRS ||  || align=right data-sort-value="0.90" | 900 m || 
|-id=553 bgcolor=#fefefe
| 551553 ||  || — || December 29, 2008 || Kitt Peak || Spacewatch ||  || align=right data-sort-value="0.57" | 570 m || 
|-id=554 bgcolor=#E9E9E9
| 551554 ||  || — || March 5, 2013 || Mount Lemmon || Mount Lemmon Survey ||  || align=right | 1.3 km || 
|-id=555 bgcolor=#E9E9E9
| 551555 ||  || — || March 6, 2013 || Haleakala || Pan-STARRS ||  || align=right data-sort-value="0.90" | 900 m || 
|-id=556 bgcolor=#E9E9E9
| 551556 ||  || — || March 13, 2013 || Mount Lemmon || Mount Lemmon Survey ||  || align=right data-sort-value="0.75" | 750 m || 
|-id=557 bgcolor=#fefefe
| 551557 ||  || — || March 5, 2013 || Haleakala || Pan-STARRS ||  || align=right data-sort-value="0.86" | 860 m || 
|-id=558 bgcolor=#fefefe
| 551558 ||  || — || February 4, 2017 || Haleakala || Pan-STARRS ||  || align=right data-sort-value="0.86" | 860 m || 
|-id=559 bgcolor=#d6d6d6
| 551559 ||  || — || March 8, 2013 || Haleakala || Pan-STARRS ||  || align=right | 2.3 km || 
|-id=560 bgcolor=#E9E9E9
| 551560 ||  || — || March 3, 2013 || Mount Lemmon || Mount Lemmon Survey ||  || align=right | 2.0 km || 
|-id=561 bgcolor=#d6d6d6
| 551561 ||  || — || January 13, 2018 || Mount Lemmon || Mount Lemmon Survey ||  || align=right | 2.5 km || 
|-id=562 bgcolor=#E9E9E9
| 551562 ||  || — || March 4, 2013 || Haleakala || Pan-STARRS ||  || align=right data-sort-value="0.78" | 780 m || 
|-id=563 bgcolor=#E9E9E9
| 551563 ||  || — || March 14, 2013 || Kitt Peak || Spacewatch ||  || align=right data-sort-value="0.71" | 710 m || 
|-id=564 bgcolor=#E9E9E9
| 551564 ||  || — || April 1, 2005 || Kitt Peak || Spacewatch ||  || align=right | 1.1 km || 
|-id=565 bgcolor=#E9E9E9
| 551565 ||  || — || March 13, 2013 || Palomar || PTF ||  || align=right data-sort-value="0.94" | 940 m || 
|-id=566 bgcolor=#E9E9E9
| 551566 ||  || — || March 17, 2013 || Palomar || PTF ||  || align=right data-sort-value="0.86" | 860 m || 
|-id=567 bgcolor=#d6d6d6
| 551567 ||  || — || April 4, 2002 || Palomar || NEAT || TIR || align=right | 2.6 km || 
|-id=568 bgcolor=#E9E9E9
| 551568 ||  || — || July 3, 2005 || Palomar || NEAT || ADE || align=right | 2.5 km || 
|-id=569 bgcolor=#fefefe
| 551569 ||  || — || March 17, 2013 || Palomar || PTF || H || align=right data-sort-value="0.65" | 650 m || 
|-id=570 bgcolor=#E9E9E9
| 551570 ||  || — || March 15, 2013 || Mount Lemmon || Mount Lemmon Survey ||  || align=right data-sort-value="0.82" | 820 m || 
|-id=571 bgcolor=#E9E9E9
| 551571 ||  || — || April 20, 2009 || Kitt Peak || Spacewatch ||  || align=right data-sort-value="0.86" | 860 m || 
|-id=572 bgcolor=#E9E9E9
| 551572 ||  || — || March 8, 2013 || Haleakala || Pan-STARRS ||  || align=right | 1.0 km || 
|-id=573 bgcolor=#E9E9E9
| 551573 ||  || — || March 25, 2009 || Siding Spring || SSS ||  || align=right | 1.5 km || 
|-id=574 bgcolor=#E9E9E9
| 551574 ||  || — || March 13, 2013 || Palomar || PTF ||  || align=right | 1.8 km || 
|-id=575 bgcolor=#fefefe
| 551575 ||  || — || August 29, 2011 || Mayhill-ISON || L. Elenin || H || align=right data-sort-value="0.51" | 510 m || 
|-id=576 bgcolor=#d6d6d6
| 551576 ||  || — || January 27, 2007 || Mount Lemmon || Mount Lemmon Survey ||  || align=right | 2.6 km || 
|-id=577 bgcolor=#E9E9E9
| 551577 ||  || — || March 15, 2013 || Kitt Peak || Spacewatch ||  || align=right | 2.0 km || 
|-id=578 bgcolor=#d6d6d6
| 551578 ||  || — || March 11, 2005 || Mount Lemmon || Mount Lemmon Survey || 3:2 || align=right | 3.7 km || 
|-id=579 bgcolor=#E9E9E9
| 551579 ||  || — || September 19, 1998 || Apache Point || SDSS Collaboration ||  || align=right data-sort-value="0.90" | 900 m || 
|-id=580 bgcolor=#E9E9E9
| 551580 ||  || — || March 4, 2013 || Haleakala || Pan-STARRS ||  || align=right | 1.2 km || 
|-id=581 bgcolor=#E9E9E9
| 551581 ||  || — || March 19, 2013 || Mayhill-ISON || L. Elenin ||  || align=right data-sort-value="0.90" | 900 m || 
|-id=582 bgcolor=#E9E9E9
| 551582 ||  || — || March 17, 2013 || Mount Lemmon || Mount Lemmon Survey ||  || align=right | 1.1 km || 
|-id=583 bgcolor=#E9E9E9
| 551583 ||  || — || March 19, 2013 || Haleakala || Pan-STARRS ||  || align=right data-sort-value="0.86" | 860 m || 
|-id=584 bgcolor=#d6d6d6
| 551584 ||  || — || October 2, 2015 || Mount Lemmon || Mount Lemmon Survey ||  || align=right | 2.0 km || 
|-id=585 bgcolor=#d6d6d6
| 551585 ||  || — || February 15, 2013 || Haleakala || Pan-STARRS ||  || align=right | 2.6 km || 
|-id=586 bgcolor=#fefefe
| 551586 ||  || — || March 14, 2013 || Palomar || PTF || H || align=right data-sort-value="0.51" | 510 m || 
|-id=587 bgcolor=#E9E9E9
| 551587 ||  || — || April 27, 2005 || Campo Imperatore || CINEOS ||  || align=right | 1.2 km || 
|-id=588 bgcolor=#d6d6d6
| 551588 ||  || — || July 24, 2003 || Palomar || NEAT || TIR || align=right | 3.0 km || 
|-id=589 bgcolor=#fefefe
| 551589 ||  || — || August 3, 2011 || Haleakala || Pan-STARRS || H || align=right data-sort-value="0.62" | 620 m || 
|-id=590 bgcolor=#d6d6d6
| 551590 ||  || — || March 31, 2008 || Mount Lemmon || Mount Lemmon Survey ||  || align=right | 2.2 km || 
|-id=591 bgcolor=#E9E9E9
| 551591 ||  || — || April 13, 2005 || Kitt Peak || Spacewatch ||  || align=right data-sort-value="0.94" | 940 m || 
|-id=592 bgcolor=#E9E9E9
| 551592 ||  || — || March 17, 2013 || Nogales || M. Schwartz, P. R. Holvorcem ||  || align=right | 1.1 km || 
|-id=593 bgcolor=#E9E9E9
| 551593 ||  || — || March 19, 2013 || Haleakala || Pan-STARRS ||  || align=right data-sort-value="0.78" | 780 m || 
|-id=594 bgcolor=#E9E9E9
| 551594 ||  || — || August 11, 2001 || Palomar || NEAT ||  || align=right | 1.3 km || 
|-id=595 bgcolor=#E9E9E9
| 551595 ||  || — || April 2, 2009 || Kitt Peak || Spacewatch ||  || align=right data-sort-value="0.94" | 940 m || 
|-id=596 bgcolor=#d6d6d6
| 551596 ||  || — || January 30, 2012 || Kitt Peak || Spacewatch || 3:2 || align=right | 5.1 km || 
|-id=597 bgcolor=#d6d6d6
| 551597 ||  || — || April 8, 2002 || Palomar || NEAT || TIR || align=right | 3.5 km || 
|-id=598 bgcolor=#E9E9E9
| 551598 ||  || — || April 7, 2013 || Mount Lemmon || Mount Lemmon Survey ||  || align=right data-sort-value="0.78" | 780 m || 
|-id=599 bgcolor=#E9E9E9
| 551599 ||  || — || March 18, 2013 || Kitt Peak || Spacewatch ||  || align=right data-sort-value="0.90" | 900 m || 
|-id=600 bgcolor=#fefefe
| 551600 ||  || — || March 5, 2013 || Haleakala || Pan-STARRS || H || align=right data-sort-value="0.62" | 620 m || 
|}

551601–551700 

|-bgcolor=#E9E9E9
| 551601 Antonijové ||  ||  || April 7, 2013 || SM Montmagastrell || J. M. Bosch, R. M. Olivera ||  || align=right | 1.2 km || 
|-id=602 bgcolor=#E9E9E9
| 551602 ||  || — || December 5, 2003 || Socorro || LINEAR ||  || align=right | 1.8 km || 
|-id=603 bgcolor=#fefefe
| 551603 ||  || — || March 16, 2013 || Kitt Peak || Spacewatch || H || align=right data-sort-value="0.51" | 510 m || 
|-id=604 bgcolor=#E9E9E9
| 551604 ||  || — || April 7, 2013 || Mount Lemmon || Mount Lemmon Survey ||  || align=right | 1.0 km || 
|-id=605 bgcolor=#E9E9E9
| 551605 ||  || — || March 19, 2009 || Mount Lemmon || Mount Lemmon Survey ||  || align=right data-sort-value="0.98" | 980 m || 
|-id=606 bgcolor=#d6d6d6
| 551606 ||  || — || April 1, 2013 || Mount Lemmon || Mount Lemmon Survey ||  || align=right | 2.2 km || 
|-id=607 bgcolor=#fefefe
| 551607 ||  || — || February 15, 2013 || ESA OGS || ESA OGS || H || align=right data-sort-value="0.54" | 540 m || 
|-id=608 bgcolor=#E9E9E9
| 551608 ||  || — || April 10, 2013 || Haleakala || Pan-STARRS ||  || align=right data-sort-value="0.98" | 980 m || 
|-id=609 bgcolor=#d6d6d6
| 551609 ||  || — || April 6, 2013 || Mount Lemmon || Mount Lemmon Survey ||  || align=right | 1.7 km || 
|-id=610 bgcolor=#E9E9E9
| 551610 ||  || — || March 14, 2013 || Palomar || PTF ||  || align=right | 1.8 km || 
|-id=611 bgcolor=#E9E9E9
| 551611 ||  || — || April 6, 2013 || Haleakala || Pan-STARRS ||  || align=right | 1.8 km || 
|-id=612 bgcolor=#E9E9E9
| 551612 ||  || — || June 28, 2001 || Anderson Mesa || LONEOS ||  || align=right | 2.1 km || 
|-id=613 bgcolor=#fefefe
| 551613 ||  || — || September 26, 2003 || Apache Point || SDSS Collaboration ||  || align=right | 1.1 km || 
|-id=614 bgcolor=#E9E9E9
| 551614 ||  || — || March 16, 2013 || Mount Lemmon || Mount Lemmon Survey ||  || align=right | 1.0 km || 
|-id=615 bgcolor=#fefefe
| 551615 ||  || — || August 25, 2011 || Siding Spring || SSS || H || align=right data-sort-value="0.65" | 650 m || 
|-id=616 bgcolor=#fefefe
| 551616 ||  || — || February 6, 2013 || ASC-Kislovodsk || ASC-Kislovodsk || H || align=right data-sort-value="0.75" | 750 m || 
|-id=617 bgcolor=#fefefe
| 551617 ||  || — || April 6, 2013 || Haleakala || Pan-STARRS ||  || align=right data-sort-value="0.65" | 650 m || 
|-id=618 bgcolor=#E9E9E9
| 551618 ||  || — || April 14, 2013 || Mount Lemmon || Mount Lemmon Survey ||  || align=right | 1.00 km || 
|-id=619 bgcolor=#fefefe
| 551619 ||  || — || April 15, 2013 || Haleakala || Pan-STARRS ||  || align=right data-sort-value="0.58" | 580 m || 
|-id=620 bgcolor=#d6d6d6
| 551620 ||  || — || April 14, 2013 || Mount Lemmon || Mount Lemmon Survey ||  || align=right | 3.1 km || 
|-id=621 bgcolor=#fefefe
| 551621 ||  || — || September 20, 2011 || Haleakala || Pan-STARRS || H || align=right data-sort-value="0.62" | 620 m || 
|-id=622 bgcolor=#E9E9E9
| 551622 ||  || — || April 6, 2005 || Catalina || CSS ||  || align=right | 1.3 km || 
|-id=623 bgcolor=#E9E9E9
| 551623 ||  || — || April 2, 2009 || Mount Lemmon || Mount Lemmon Survey ||  || align=right data-sort-value="0.98" | 980 m || 
|-id=624 bgcolor=#E9E9E9
| 551624 ||  || — || April 15, 2013 || Haleakala || Pan-STARRS ||  || align=right data-sort-value="0.88" | 880 m || 
|-id=625 bgcolor=#E9E9E9
| 551625 ||  || — || July 4, 2005 || Palomar || NEAT ||  || align=right | 2.3 km || 
|-id=626 bgcolor=#E9E9E9
| 551626 ||  || — || September 14, 2006 || Mauna Kea || J. Masiero, R. Jedicke ||  || align=right data-sort-value="0.90" | 900 m || 
|-id=627 bgcolor=#fefefe
| 551627 ||  || — || March 19, 2013 || Haleakala || Pan-STARRS ||  || align=right data-sort-value="0.76" | 760 m || 
|-id=628 bgcolor=#E9E9E9
| 551628 ||  || — || April 18, 2009 || Kitt Peak || Spacewatch ||  || align=right data-sort-value="0.71" | 710 m || 
|-id=629 bgcolor=#d6d6d6
| 551629 ||  || — || November 12, 2005 || Kitt Peak || Spacewatch ||  || align=right | 3.4 km || 
|-id=630 bgcolor=#E9E9E9
| 551630 ||  || — || October 25, 2011 || Haleakala || Pan-STARRS ||  || align=right | 1.1 km || 
|-id=631 bgcolor=#fefefe
| 551631 ||  || — || March 28, 2009 || Mount Lemmon || Mount Lemmon Survey ||  || align=right data-sort-value="0.85" | 850 m || 
|-id=632 bgcolor=#E9E9E9
| 551632 ||  || — || July 4, 2005 || Palomar || NEAT ||  || align=right | 1.7 km || 
|-id=633 bgcolor=#E9E9E9
| 551633 ||  || — || March 18, 2013 || Kitt Peak || Spacewatch ||  || align=right data-sort-value="0.86" | 860 m || 
|-id=634 bgcolor=#d6d6d6
| 551634 ||  || — || January 7, 2006 || Mount Lemmon || Mount Lemmon Survey ||  || align=right | 2.8 km || 
|-id=635 bgcolor=#d6d6d6
| 551635 ||  || — || April 12, 2013 || Haleakala || Pan-STARRS || Tj (2.99) || align=right | 2.9 km || 
|-id=636 bgcolor=#E9E9E9
| 551636 ||  || — || March 13, 2013 || Kitt Peak || Spacewatch ||  || align=right data-sort-value="0.90" | 900 m || 
|-id=637 bgcolor=#d6d6d6
| 551637 ||  || — || November 8, 2010 || Kitt Peak || Spacewatch ||  || align=right | 3.6 km || 
|-id=638 bgcolor=#E9E9E9
| 551638 ||  || — || November 14, 2007 || Mount Lemmon || Mount Lemmon Survey ||  || align=right data-sort-value="0.90" | 900 m || 
|-id=639 bgcolor=#E9E9E9
| 551639 ||  || — || April 3, 2013 || Palomar || PTF ||  || align=right data-sort-value="0.86" | 860 m || 
|-id=640 bgcolor=#fefefe
| 551640 ||  || — || October 27, 1995 || Kitt Peak || Spacewatch ||  || align=right data-sort-value="0.86" | 860 m || 
|-id=641 bgcolor=#E9E9E9
| 551641 ||  || — || May 13, 2005 || Kitt Peak || Spacewatch || KON || align=right | 1.9 km || 
|-id=642 bgcolor=#E9E9E9
| 551642 ||  || — || April 11, 2013 || Mount Lemmon || Mount Lemmon Survey ||  || align=right data-sort-value="0.82" | 820 m || 
|-id=643 bgcolor=#E9E9E9
| 551643 ||  || — || April 11, 2013 || Kitt Peak || Spacewatch ||  || align=right | 1.5 km || 
|-id=644 bgcolor=#E9E9E9
| 551644 ||  || — || April 7, 2013 || Kitt Peak || Spacewatch ||  || align=right | 1.4 km || 
|-id=645 bgcolor=#E9E9E9
| 551645 ||  || — || May 20, 2005 || Mount Lemmon || Mount Lemmon Survey ||  || align=right | 1.9 km || 
|-id=646 bgcolor=#E9E9E9
| 551646 ||  || — || May 3, 2009 || Mount Lemmon || Mount Lemmon Survey ||  || align=right data-sort-value="0.98" | 980 m || 
|-id=647 bgcolor=#d6d6d6
| 551647 ||  || — || April 5, 2013 || Palomar || PTF ||  || align=right | 3.1 km || 
|-id=648 bgcolor=#d6d6d6
| 551648 ||  || — || April 11, 2013 || Nogales || M. Schwartz, P. R. Holvorcem ||  || align=right | 4.3 km || 
|-id=649 bgcolor=#E9E9E9
| 551649 ||  || — || April 12, 2013 || Nogales || M. Schwartz, P. R. Holvorcem ||  || align=right data-sort-value="0.94" | 940 m || 
|-id=650 bgcolor=#E9E9E9
| 551650 ||  || — || June 29, 2005 || Palomar || NEAT || EUN || align=right | 1.5 km || 
|-id=651 bgcolor=#E9E9E9
| 551651 ||  || — || March 18, 2009 || Kitt Peak || Spacewatch ||  || align=right data-sort-value="0.98" | 980 m || 
|-id=652 bgcolor=#d6d6d6
| 551652 ||  || — || March 15, 2013 || Kitt Peak || Spacewatch || 3:2 || align=right | 3.9 km || 
|-id=653 bgcolor=#E9E9E9
| 551653 ||  || — || August 19, 2001 || Haleakala || AMOS ||  || align=right | 1.6 km || 
|-id=654 bgcolor=#E9E9E9
| 551654 ||  || — || January 31, 2003 || Palomar || NEAT || WIT || align=right | 1.4 km || 
|-id=655 bgcolor=#d6d6d6
| 551655 ||  || — || April 14, 2013 || Palomar || PTF ||  || align=right | 2.8 km || 
|-id=656 bgcolor=#E9E9E9
| 551656 ||  || — || November 3, 2011 || Kitt Peak || Spacewatch ||  || align=right | 1.2 km || 
|-id=657 bgcolor=#E9E9E9
| 551657 ||  || — || April 13, 2013 || Haleakala || Pan-STARRS ||  || align=right | 1.6 km || 
|-id=658 bgcolor=#E9E9E9
| 551658 ||  || — || May 26, 2009 || Mount Lemmon || Mount Lemmon Survey ||  || align=right data-sort-value="0.83" | 830 m || 
|-id=659 bgcolor=#d6d6d6
| 551659 ||  || — || June 29, 2014 || Haleakala || Pan-STARRS ||  || align=right | 2.1 km || 
|-id=660 bgcolor=#E9E9E9
| 551660 ||  || — || April 13, 2013 || Haleakala || Pan-STARRS ||  || align=right | 1.2 km || 
|-id=661 bgcolor=#E9E9E9
| 551661 ||  || — || April 11, 2013 || Mount Lemmon || Mount Lemmon Survey ||  || align=right | 1.4 km || 
|-id=662 bgcolor=#d6d6d6
| 551662 ||  || — || November 25, 2016 || Mount Lemmon || Mount Lemmon Survey ||  || align=right | 2.4 km || 
|-id=663 bgcolor=#E9E9E9
| 551663 ||  || — || October 12, 2015 || Haleakala || Pan-STARRS ||  || align=right data-sort-value="0.78" | 780 m || 
|-id=664 bgcolor=#E9E9E9
| 551664 ||  || — || April 7, 2013 || Mount Lemmon || Mount Lemmon Survey ||  || align=right | 1.2 km || 
|-id=665 bgcolor=#E9E9E9
| 551665 ||  || — || April 12, 2013 || Haleakala || Pan-STARRS ||  || align=right data-sort-value="0.94" | 940 m || 
|-id=666 bgcolor=#fefefe
| 551666 ||  || — || April 11, 2013 || ESA OGS || ESA OGS ||  || align=right data-sort-value="0.62" | 620 m || 
|-id=667 bgcolor=#E9E9E9
| 551667 ||  || — || April 12, 2013 || Haleakala || Pan-STARRS ||  || align=right | 1.2 km || 
|-id=668 bgcolor=#fefefe
| 551668 ||  || — || November 20, 2003 || Socorro || LINEAR || H || align=right data-sort-value="0.71" | 710 m || 
|-id=669 bgcolor=#E9E9E9
| 551669 ||  || — || April 12, 2013 || Elena Remote || A. Oreshko ||  || align=right data-sort-value="0.98" | 980 m || 
|-id=670 bgcolor=#fefefe
| 551670 ||  || — || April 16, 2013 || Nogales || M. Schwartz, P. R. Holvorcem || H || align=right data-sort-value="0.78" | 780 m || 
|-id=671 bgcolor=#E9E9E9
| 551671 ||  || — || September 1, 2005 || Anderson Mesa || LONEOS ||  || align=right | 1.7 km || 
|-id=672 bgcolor=#fefefe
| 551672 ||  || — || November 28, 2003 || Kitt Peak || Spacewatch || H || align=right data-sort-value="0.75" | 750 m || 
|-id=673 bgcolor=#E9E9E9
| 551673 ||  || — || May 15, 2005 || Palomar || NEAT ||  || align=right | 1.3 km || 
|-id=674 bgcolor=#E9E9E9
| 551674 ||  || — || November 21, 2003 || Nogales || P. R. Holvorcem, M. Schwartz ||  || align=right | 1.4 km || 
|-id=675 bgcolor=#E9E9E9
| 551675 ||  || — || March 31, 2009 || Mount Lemmon || Mount Lemmon Survey ||  || align=right data-sort-value="0.90" | 900 m || 
|-id=676 bgcolor=#E9E9E9
| 551676 ||  || — || April 16, 2004 || Apache Point || SDSS Collaboration || HNS || align=right | 1.2 km || 
|-id=677 bgcolor=#fefefe
| 551677 ||  || — || January 23, 2010 || Moletai || K. Černis, J. Zdanavičius || H || align=right data-sort-value="0.86" | 860 m || 
|-id=678 bgcolor=#E9E9E9
| 551678 ||  || — || January 17, 2004 || Palomar || NEAT ||  || align=right | 1.4 km || 
|-id=679 bgcolor=#E9E9E9
| 551679 ||  || — || April 30, 2009 || Kitt Peak || Spacewatch ||  || align=right | 1.0 km || 
|-id=680 bgcolor=#fefefe
| 551680 ||  || — || April 14, 2013 || Palomar || PTF || H || align=right data-sort-value="0.68" | 680 m || 
|-id=681 bgcolor=#d6d6d6
| 551681 ||  || — || January 2, 2012 || Kitt Peak || Spacewatch || HYG || align=right | 3.3 km || 
|-id=682 bgcolor=#E9E9E9
| 551682 ||  || — || March 16, 2013 || Kitt Peak || Spacewatch ||  || align=right data-sort-value="0.86" | 860 m || 
|-id=683 bgcolor=#E9E9E9
| 551683 ||  || — || April 20, 2013 || Palomar || PTF ||  || align=right | 1.6 km || 
|-id=684 bgcolor=#d6d6d6
| 551684 ||  || — || November 18, 2011 || Mount Lemmon || Mount Lemmon Survey ||  || align=right | 3.5 km || 
|-id=685 bgcolor=#FFC2E0
| 551685 ||  || — || March 26, 2006 || Mount Lemmon || Mount Lemmon Survey || APOPHA || align=right data-sort-value="0.16" | 160 m || 
|-id=686 bgcolor=#E9E9E9
| 551686 ||  || — || April 30, 2013 || Kitt Peak || Spacewatch ||  || align=right | 1.0 km || 
|-id=687 bgcolor=#fefefe
| 551687 ||  || — || May 28, 2008 || Mount Lemmon || Mount Lemmon Survey || H || align=right data-sort-value="0.71" | 710 m || 
|-id=688 bgcolor=#E9E9E9
| 551688 ||  || — || January 17, 2004 || Palomar || NEAT ||  || align=right | 2.1 km || 
|-id=689 bgcolor=#E9E9E9
| 551689 ||  || — || December 25, 2003 || Kitt Peak || Spacewatch ||  || align=right | 1.4 km || 
|-id=690 bgcolor=#E9E9E9
| 551690 ||  || — || April 20, 2013 || Mount Lemmon || Mount Lemmon Survey ||  || align=right | 1.2 km || 
|-id=691 bgcolor=#E9E9E9
| 551691 ||  || — || May 4, 2013 || Haleakala || Pan-STARRS ||  || align=right | 1.2 km || 
|-id=692 bgcolor=#d6d6d6
| 551692 ||  || — || April 9, 2013 || Haleakala || Pan-STARRS ||  || align=right | 2.6 km || 
|-id=693 bgcolor=#E9E9E9
| 551693 ||  || — || April 16, 2013 || Cerro Tololo-DECam || CTIO-DECam ||  || align=right data-sort-value="0.78" | 780 m || 
|-id=694 bgcolor=#E9E9E9
| 551694 ||  || — || April 9, 2013 || Haleakala || Pan-STARRS ||  || align=right data-sort-value="0.94" | 940 m || 
|-id=695 bgcolor=#d6d6d6
| 551695 ||  || — || September 10, 2009 || ESA OGS || ESA OGS ||  || align=right | 2.3 km || 
|-id=696 bgcolor=#E9E9E9
| 551696 ||  || — || May 4, 2013 || Haleakala || Pan-STARRS ||  || align=right | 1.2 km || 
|-id=697 bgcolor=#E9E9E9
| 551697 ||  || — || April 16, 2013 || Cerro Tololo-DECam || CTIO-DECam ||  || align=right data-sort-value="0.90" | 900 m || 
|-id=698 bgcolor=#E9E9E9
| 551698 ||  || — || October 26, 2011 || Haleakala || Pan-STARRS ||  || align=right data-sort-value="0.78" | 780 m || 
|-id=699 bgcolor=#E9E9E9
| 551699 ||  || — || July 13, 2001 || Palomar || NEAT ||  || align=right data-sort-value="0.78" | 780 m || 
|-id=700 bgcolor=#E9E9E9
| 551700 ||  || — || November 19, 2007 || Mount Lemmon || Mount Lemmon Survey ||  || align=right | 1.2 km || 
|}

551701–551800 

|-bgcolor=#E9E9E9
| 551701 ||  || — || April 9, 2013 || Haleakala || Pan-STARRS ||  || align=right | 1.3 km || 
|-id=702 bgcolor=#E9E9E9
| 551702 ||  || — || May 1, 2013 || Mount Lemmon || Mount Lemmon Survey ||  || align=right data-sort-value="0.94" | 940 m || 
|-id=703 bgcolor=#E9E9E9
| 551703 ||  || — || September 26, 2011 || Kitt Peak || Spacewatch ||  || align=right | 1.3 km || 
|-id=704 bgcolor=#E9E9E9
| 551704 ||  || — || October 24, 2011 || Haleakala || Pan-STARRS ||  || align=right | 1.1 km || 
|-id=705 bgcolor=#E9E9E9
| 551705 ||  || — || April 9, 2013 || Haleakala || Pan-STARRS ||  || align=right | 1.4 km || 
|-id=706 bgcolor=#E9E9E9
| 551706 ||  || — || June 10, 2005 || Catalina || CSS ||  || align=right | 2.9 km || 
|-id=707 bgcolor=#E9E9E9
| 551707 ||  || — || October 25, 2011 || Haleakala || Pan-STARRS || KON || align=right | 1.7 km || 
|-id=708 bgcolor=#E9E9E9
| 551708 ||  || — || April 9, 2013 || Haleakala || Pan-STARRS ||  || align=right data-sort-value="0.78" | 780 m || 
|-id=709 bgcolor=#E9E9E9
| 551709 ||  || — || April 9, 2013 || Haleakala || Pan-STARRS ||  || align=right data-sort-value="0.86" | 860 m || 
|-id=710 bgcolor=#E9E9E9
| 551710 ||  || — || March 15, 2013 || Kitt Peak || Spacewatch ||  || align=right | 1.1 km || 
|-id=711 bgcolor=#E9E9E9
| 551711 ||  || — || October 29, 2002 || Kitt Peak || Spacewatch ||  || align=right | 1.8 km || 
|-id=712 bgcolor=#E9E9E9
| 551712 ||  || — || April 9, 2013 || Haleakala || Pan-STARRS ||  || align=right data-sort-value="0.71" | 710 m || 
|-id=713 bgcolor=#E9E9E9
| 551713 ||  || — || April 10, 2013 || Haleakala || Pan-STARRS ||  || align=right | 1.1 km || 
|-id=714 bgcolor=#E9E9E9
| 551714 ||  || — || December 5, 2007 || Kitt Peak || Spacewatch || (5) || align=right data-sort-value="0.61" | 610 m || 
|-id=715 bgcolor=#E9E9E9
| 551715 ||  || — || September 2, 2010 || Mount Lemmon || Mount Lemmon Survey ||  || align=right | 1.2 km || 
|-id=716 bgcolor=#E9E9E9
| 551716 ||  || — || April 9, 2013 || Haleakala || Pan-STARRS || EUN || align=right data-sort-value="0.96" | 960 m || 
|-id=717 bgcolor=#E9E9E9
| 551717 ||  || — || March 17, 2013 || Mount Lemmon || Mount Lemmon Survey ||  || align=right data-sort-value="0.75" | 750 m || 
|-id=718 bgcolor=#d6d6d6
| 551718 ||  || — || April 7, 2013 || Mount Lemmon || Mount Lemmon Survey || 3:2 || align=right | 4.2 km || 
|-id=719 bgcolor=#E9E9E9
| 551719 ||  || — || March 29, 2001 || Kitt Peak || Spacewatch ||  || align=right data-sort-value="0.96" | 960 m || 
|-id=720 bgcolor=#E9E9E9
| 551720 ||  || — || November 27, 2011 || Catalina || CSS ||  || align=right data-sort-value="0.86" | 860 m || 
|-id=721 bgcolor=#E9E9E9
| 551721 ||  || — || September 30, 2006 || Kitt Peak || Spacewatch ||  || align=right | 1.3 km || 
|-id=722 bgcolor=#E9E9E9
| 551722 ||  || — || April 16, 2013 || Haleakala || Pan-STARRS ||  || align=right data-sort-value="0.94" | 940 m || 
|-id=723 bgcolor=#fefefe
| 551723 ||  || — || April 19, 2013 || Haleakala || Pan-STARRS ||  || align=right data-sort-value="0.71" | 710 m || 
|-id=724 bgcolor=#E9E9E9
| 551724 ||  || — || April 19, 2013 || Haleakala || Pan-STARRS ||  || align=right | 1.5 km || 
|-id=725 bgcolor=#E9E9E9
| 551725 ||  || — || April 16, 2013 || Haleakala || Pan-STARRS ||  || align=right | 1.8 km || 
|-id=726 bgcolor=#E9E9E9
| 551726 ||  || — || March 14, 2013 || Palomar || PTF ||  || align=right data-sort-value="0.90" | 900 m || 
|-id=727 bgcolor=#E9E9E9
| 551727 ||  || — || April 15, 2013 || Haleakala || Pan-STARRS ||  || align=right | 1.4 km || 
|-id=728 bgcolor=#FA8072
| 551728 ||  || — || September 18, 2003 || Kitt Peak || Spacewatch ||  || align=right data-sort-value="0.62" | 620 m || 
|-id=729 bgcolor=#E9E9E9
| 551729 ||  || — || August 6, 2005 || Palomar || NEAT ||  || align=right | 1.4 km || 
|-id=730 bgcolor=#E9E9E9
| 551730 ||  || — || November 13, 2002 || Palomar || NEAT || MAR || align=right | 1.4 km || 
|-id=731 bgcolor=#E9E9E9
| 551731 ||  || — || October 21, 2006 || Kitt Peak || Spacewatch ||  || align=right data-sort-value="0.94" | 940 m || 
|-id=732 bgcolor=#E9E9E9
| 551732 ||  || — || April 21, 2009 || Kitt Peak || Spacewatch ||  || align=right data-sort-value="0.86" | 860 m || 
|-id=733 bgcolor=#E9E9E9
| 551733 ||  || — || April 13, 2013 || Haleakala || Pan-STARRS ||  || align=right | 1.8 km || 
|-id=734 bgcolor=#E9E9E9
| 551734 ||  || — || October 28, 2006 || Mount Lemmon || Mount Lemmon Survey ||  || align=right | 1.9 km || 
|-id=735 bgcolor=#E9E9E9
| 551735 ||  || — || January 1, 2003 || Kitt Peak || Spacewatch ||  || align=right | 2.5 km || 
|-id=736 bgcolor=#d6d6d6
| 551736 ||  || — || April 15, 2013 || Haleakala || Pan-STARRS ||  || align=right | 2.4 km || 
|-id=737 bgcolor=#E9E9E9
| 551737 ||  || — || January 17, 2008 || Mount Lemmon || Mount Lemmon Survey ||  || align=right | 1.2 km || 
|-id=738 bgcolor=#d6d6d6
| 551738 ||  || — || February 15, 2013 || Haleakala || Pan-STARRS ||  || align=right | 2.7 km || 
|-id=739 bgcolor=#d6d6d6
| 551739 ||  || — || May 5, 2013 || Haleakala || Pan-STARRS ||  || align=right | 2.3 km || 
|-id=740 bgcolor=#d6d6d6
| 551740 ||  || — || May 7, 2013 || Kitt Peak || Spacewatch || Tj (2.85) || align=right | 4.7 km || 
|-id=741 bgcolor=#E9E9E9
| 551741 ||  || — || January 13, 2008 || Kitt Peak || Spacewatch ||  || align=right | 1.1 km || 
|-id=742 bgcolor=#E9E9E9
| 551742 ||  || — || July 5, 2005 || Palomar || NEAT || BRG || align=right | 1.4 km || 
|-id=743 bgcolor=#E9E9E9
| 551743 ||  || — || April 11, 2013 || Kitt Peak || Spacewatch ||  || align=right | 1.0 km || 
|-id=744 bgcolor=#fefefe
| 551744 ||  || — || May 12, 2013 || Elena Remote || A. Oreshko ||  || align=right data-sort-value="0.59" | 590 m || 
|-id=745 bgcolor=#E9E9E9
| 551745 ||  || — || April 24, 2009 || Bergisch Gladbach || W. Bickel ||  || align=right | 1.4 km || 
|-id=746 bgcolor=#FA8072
| 551746 ||  || — || May 10, 2013 || Haleakala || Pan-STARRS ||  || align=right data-sort-value="0.57" | 570 m || 
|-id=747 bgcolor=#E9E9E9
| 551747 ||  || — || May 11, 2013 || Mount Lemmon || Mount Lemmon Survey ||  || align=right | 1.5 km || 
|-id=748 bgcolor=#E9E9E9
| 551748 ||  || — || August 4, 2005 || Palomar || NEAT || BAR || align=right | 1.1 km || 
|-id=749 bgcolor=#E9E9E9
| 551749 ||  || — || May 12, 2013 || Mount Lemmon || Mount Lemmon Survey ||  || align=right | 1.5 km || 
|-id=750 bgcolor=#E9E9E9
| 551750 ||  || — || October 11, 2001 || Palomar || NEAT || ADE || align=right | 2.4 km || 
|-id=751 bgcolor=#E9E9E9
| 551751 ||  || — || May 13, 2013 || Palomar || PTF ||  || align=right | 1.1 km || 
|-id=752 bgcolor=#E9E9E9
| 551752 ||  || — || May 9, 2005 || Kitt Peak || Spacewatch ||  || align=right | 1.1 km || 
|-id=753 bgcolor=#d6d6d6
| 551753 ||  || — || November 7, 2005 || Mauna Kea || Mauna Kea Obs. ||  || align=right | 4.3 km || 
|-id=754 bgcolor=#E9E9E9
| 551754 ||  || — || April 20, 2013 || Mount Lemmon || Mount Lemmon Survey ||  || align=right | 1.5 km || 
|-id=755 bgcolor=#fefefe
| 551755 ||  || — || April 15, 2013 || Haleakala || Pan-STARRS ||  || align=right data-sort-value="0.62" | 620 m || 
|-id=756 bgcolor=#E9E9E9
| 551756 ||  || — || April 13, 2013 || Mount Lemmon || Mount Lemmon Survey ||  || align=right | 1.3 km || 
|-id=757 bgcolor=#d6d6d6
| 551757 ||  || — || November 14, 2010 || Mount Lemmon || Mount Lemmon Survey ||  || align=right | 3.4 km || 
|-id=758 bgcolor=#E9E9E9
| 551758 ||  || — || March 11, 2004 || Palomar || NEAT ||  || align=right | 2.0 km || 
|-id=759 bgcolor=#fefefe
| 551759 ||  || — || October 11, 2004 || Kitt Peak || L. H. Wasserman, J. R. Lovering ||  || align=right data-sort-value="0.62" | 620 m || 
|-id=760 bgcolor=#E9E9E9
| 551760 ||  || — || May 8, 2013 || Haleakala || Pan-STARRS ||  || align=right data-sort-value="0.78" | 780 m || 
|-id=761 bgcolor=#E9E9E9
| 551761 ||  || — || August 9, 2001 || Palomar || NEAT ||  || align=right | 1.3 km || 
|-id=762 bgcolor=#d6d6d6
| 551762 ||  || — || January 8, 2002 || Kitt Peak || Spacewatch ||  || align=right | 2.2 km || 
|-id=763 bgcolor=#d6d6d6
| 551763 ||  || — || April 10, 2013 || Mount Lemmon || Mount Lemmon Survey ||  || align=right | 2.9 km || 
|-id=764 bgcolor=#fefefe
| 551764 ||  || — || September 25, 2007 || Mount Lemmon || Mount Lemmon Survey ||  || align=right data-sort-value="0.76" | 760 m || 
|-id=765 bgcolor=#fefefe
| 551765 ||  || — || April 13, 2013 || Kitt Peak || Spacewatch ||  || align=right data-sort-value="0.59" | 590 m || 
|-id=766 bgcolor=#E9E9E9
| 551766 ||  || — || August 27, 2005 || Palomar || NEAT ||  || align=right | 1.8 km || 
|-id=767 bgcolor=#E9E9E9
| 551767 ||  || — || February 8, 2008 || Mount Lemmon || Mount Lemmon Survey ||  || align=right | 1.2 km || 
|-id=768 bgcolor=#d6d6d6
| 551768 ||  || — || September 17, 2009 || Kitt Peak || Spacewatch ||  || align=right | 2.7 km || 
|-id=769 bgcolor=#E9E9E9
| 551769 ||  || — || April 12, 2013 || Haleakala || Pan-STARRS ||  || align=right | 1.2 km || 
|-id=770 bgcolor=#E9E9E9
| 551770 ||  || — || May 2, 2009 || Siding Spring || SSS ||  || align=right | 2.2 km || 
|-id=771 bgcolor=#E9E9E9
| 551771 ||  || — || October 13, 2010 || Bergisch Gladbach || W. Bickel ||  || align=right | 2.0 km || 
|-id=772 bgcolor=#E9E9E9
| 551772 ||  || — || May 3, 2013 || Mount Lemmon || Mount Lemmon Survey ||  || align=right data-sort-value="0.78" | 780 m || 
|-id=773 bgcolor=#E9E9E9
| 551773 ||  || — || May 11, 2013 || Catalina || CSS ||  || align=right | 1.3 km || 
|-id=774 bgcolor=#E9E9E9
| 551774 ||  || — || October 16, 2015 || Mount Lemmon || Mount Lemmon Survey ||  || align=right | 1.4 km || 
|-id=775 bgcolor=#E9E9E9
| 551775 ||  || — || November 23, 2015 || Mount Lemmon || Mount Lemmon Survey ||  || align=right | 1.3 km || 
|-id=776 bgcolor=#E9E9E9
| 551776 ||  || — || May 15, 2013 || Haleakala || Pan-STARRS ||  || align=right | 1.3 km || 
|-id=777 bgcolor=#fefefe
| 551777 ||  || — || March 13, 2016 || Haleakala || Pan-STARRS ||  || align=right data-sort-value="0.47" | 470 m || 
|-id=778 bgcolor=#E9E9E9
| 551778 ||  || — || May 12, 2013 || Mount Lemmon || Mount Lemmon Survey ||  || align=right data-sort-value="0.86" | 860 m || 
|-id=779 bgcolor=#E9E9E9
| 551779 ||  || — || May 8, 2013 || Haleakala || Pan-STARRS ||  || align=right | 1.2 km || 
|-id=780 bgcolor=#E9E9E9
| 551780 ||  || — || September 30, 2010 || Mount Lemmon || Mount Lemmon Survey ||  || align=right | 2.1 km || 
|-id=781 bgcolor=#FA8072
| 551781 ||  || — || December 7, 2006 || Palomar || NEAT ||  || align=right | 1.1 km || 
|-id=782 bgcolor=#E9E9E9
| 551782 ||  || — || January 27, 2012 || Mount Lemmon || Mount Lemmon Survey || EUN || align=right | 1.1 km || 
|-id=783 bgcolor=#E9E9E9
| 551783 ||  || — || December 27, 2003 || Kitt Peak || Spacewatch ||  || align=right | 1.1 km || 
|-id=784 bgcolor=#E9E9E9
| 551784 ||  || — || March 14, 2004 || Palomar || NEAT ||  || align=right | 1.7 km || 
|-id=785 bgcolor=#E9E9E9
| 551785 ||  || — || April 10, 2013 || Kitt Peak || Spacewatch ||  || align=right | 1.4 km || 
|-id=786 bgcolor=#d6d6d6
| 551786 ||  || — || May 31, 2008 || Mount Lemmon || Mount Lemmon Survey ||  || align=right | 4.4 km || 
|-id=787 bgcolor=#E9E9E9
| 551787 ||  || — || August 29, 2005 || Palomar || NEAT ||  || align=right | 1.9 km || 
|-id=788 bgcolor=#E9E9E9
| 551788 ||  || — || July 18, 2001 || Palomar || NEAT ||  || align=right | 1.1 km || 
|-id=789 bgcolor=#fefefe
| 551789 ||  || — || November 18, 2007 || Kitt Peak || Spacewatch ||  || align=right data-sort-value="0.68" | 680 m || 
|-id=790 bgcolor=#fefefe
| 551790 ||  || — || September 14, 2007 || Mount Lemmon || Mount Lemmon Survey ||  || align=right data-sort-value="0.57" | 570 m || 
|-id=791 bgcolor=#E9E9E9
| 551791 ||  || — || January 15, 2008 || Mount Lemmon || Mount Lemmon Survey ||  || align=right | 1.5 km || 
|-id=792 bgcolor=#E9E9E9
| 551792 ||  || — || August 28, 2005 || Kitt Peak || Spacewatch ||  || align=right | 1.7 km || 
|-id=793 bgcolor=#E9E9E9
| 551793 ||  || — || January 12, 2008 || Kitt Peak || Spacewatch ||  || align=right data-sort-value="0.98" | 980 m || 
|-id=794 bgcolor=#E9E9E9
| 551794 ||  || — || May 30, 2013 || Mount Lemmon || Mount Lemmon Survey ||  || align=right | 1.5 km || 
|-id=795 bgcolor=#E9E9E9
| 551795 ||  || — || October 28, 2006 || Kitt Peak || Spacewatch ||  || align=right | 1.2 km || 
|-id=796 bgcolor=#E9E9E9
| 551796 ||  || — || May 31, 2013 || Nogales || M. Schwartz, P. R. Holvorcem ||  || align=right | 1.9 km || 
|-id=797 bgcolor=#E9E9E9
| 551797 ||  || — || September 29, 2001 || Palomar || NEAT ||  || align=right | 1.8 km || 
|-id=798 bgcolor=#E9E9E9
| 551798 ||  || — || August 23, 2001 || Anderson Mesa || LONEOS ||  || align=right | 1.1 km || 
|-id=799 bgcolor=#E9E9E9
| 551799 ||  || — || May 31, 2013 || Kitt Peak || Spacewatch ||  || align=right | 1.5 km || 
|-id=800 bgcolor=#E9E9E9
| 551800 ||  || — || May 18, 2013 || Mount Lemmon || Mount Lemmon Survey ||  || align=right data-sort-value="0.98" | 980 m || 
|}

551801–551900 

|-bgcolor=#E9E9E9
| 551801 ||  || — || May 16, 2013 || Mount Lemmon || Mount Lemmon Survey ||  || align=right | 1.5 km || 
|-id=802 bgcolor=#fefefe
| 551802 ||  || — || November 21, 2009 || Mount Lemmon || Mount Lemmon Survey || H || align=right data-sort-value="0.52" | 520 m || 
|-id=803 bgcolor=#FA8072
| 551803 ||  || — || July 7, 2003 || Palomar || NEAT ||  || align=right data-sort-value="0.68" | 680 m || 
|-id=804 bgcolor=#E9E9E9
| 551804 ||  || — || May 8, 2013 || Haleakala || Pan-STARRS ||  || align=right | 1.3 km || 
|-id=805 bgcolor=#E9E9E9
| 551805 ||  || — || May 16, 2013 || Nogales || M. Schwartz, P. R. Holvorcem ||  || align=right | 1.6 km || 
|-id=806 bgcolor=#E9E9E9
| 551806 ||  || — || March 3, 2000 || Apache Point || SDSS Collaboration ||  || align=right | 1.2 km || 
|-id=807 bgcolor=#E9E9E9
| 551807 ||  || — || June 4, 2013 || Mount Lemmon || Mount Lemmon Survey ||  || align=right | 1.3 km || 
|-id=808 bgcolor=#E9E9E9
| 551808 ||  || — || June 4, 2013 || Mount Lemmon || Mount Lemmon Survey ||  || align=right | 1.2 km || 
|-id=809 bgcolor=#fefefe
| 551809 ||  || — || June 5, 2013 || Mount Lemmon || Mount Lemmon Survey ||  || align=right data-sort-value="0.52" | 520 m || 
|-id=810 bgcolor=#E9E9E9
| 551810 ||  || — || June 5, 2013 || Mount Lemmon || Mount Lemmon Survey ||  || align=right | 1.3 km || 
|-id=811 bgcolor=#d6d6d6
| 551811 ||  || — || August 28, 2002 || Socorro || LINEAR || Tj (2.95) || align=right | 2.9 km || 
|-id=812 bgcolor=#E9E9E9
| 551812 ||  || — || June 1, 2013 || Mount Lemmon || Mount Lemmon Survey ||  || align=right | 1.3 km || 
|-id=813 bgcolor=#E9E9E9
| 551813 ||  || — || July 13, 2001 || Palomar || NEAT ||  || align=right | 1.2 km || 
|-id=814 bgcolor=#E9E9E9
| 551814 ||  || — || October 17, 2010 || Mount Lemmon || Mount Lemmon Survey ||  || align=right | 1.0 km || 
|-id=815 bgcolor=#E9E9E9
| 551815 ||  || — || June 1, 2013 || Haleakala || Pan-STARRS ||  || align=right | 1.7 km || 
|-id=816 bgcolor=#E9E9E9
| 551816 ||  || — || August 17, 2009 || Kitt Peak || Spacewatch ||  || align=right | 1.2 km || 
|-id=817 bgcolor=#E9E9E9
| 551817 ||  || — || July 27, 2001 || Palomar || NEAT ||  || align=right | 1.1 km || 
|-id=818 bgcolor=#E9E9E9
| 551818 ||  || — || January 26, 2003 || Palomar || NEAT || 526 || align=right | 2.7 km || 
|-id=819 bgcolor=#E9E9E9
| 551819 ||  || — || May 12, 2013 || Mount Lemmon || Mount Lemmon Survey ||  || align=right | 1.8 km || 
|-id=820 bgcolor=#E9E9E9
| 551820 ||  || — || June 12, 2013 || Haleakala || Pan-STARRS ||  || align=right | 1.6 km || 
|-id=821 bgcolor=#fefefe
| 551821 ||  || — || January 28, 2004 || Apache Point || SDSS Collaboration || H || align=right data-sort-value="0.98" | 980 m || 
|-id=822 bgcolor=#fefefe
| 551822 ||  || — || June 10, 2013 || Mount Lemmon || Mount Lemmon Survey ||  || align=right data-sort-value="0.52" | 520 m || 
|-id=823 bgcolor=#d6d6d6
| 551823 ||  || — || September 29, 2009 || Mount Lemmon || Mount Lemmon Survey ||  || align=right | 3.9 km || 
|-id=824 bgcolor=#E9E9E9
| 551824 ||  || — || June 1, 2013 || Catalina || CSS ||  || align=right | 1.6 km || 
|-id=825 bgcolor=#E9E9E9
| 551825 ||  || — || May 17, 2013 || Nogales || M. Schwartz, P. R. Holvorcem ||  || align=right | 1.8 km || 
|-id=826 bgcolor=#E9E9E9
| 551826 ||  || — || November 12, 2010 || Mount Lemmon || Mount Lemmon Survey || MAR || align=right | 1.3 km || 
|-id=827 bgcolor=#fefefe
| 551827 ||  || — || December 1, 2011 || Haleakala || Pan-STARRS || H || align=right data-sort-value="0.68" | 680 m || 
|-id=828 bgcolor=#E9E9E9
| 551828 ||  || — || June 11, 2013 || Mount Lemmon || Mount Lemmon Survey ||  || align=right | 1.4 km || 
|-id=829 bgcolor=#fefefe
| 551829 ||  || — || June 12, 2013 || Haleakala || Pan-STARRS ||  || align=right data-sort-value="0.62" | 620 m || 
|-id=830 bgcolor=#E9E9E9
| 551830 ||  || — || June 12, 2013 || Haleakala || Pan-STARRS ||  || align=right | 1.4 km || 
|-id=831 bgcolor=#d6d6d6
| 551831 ||  || — || September 23, 2015 || Haleakala || Pan-STARRS ||  || align=right | 2.5 km || 
|-id=832 bgcolor=#FA8072
| 551832 ||  || — || June 6, 2013 || Mount Lemmon || Mount Lemmon Survey || H || align=right data-sort-value="0.59" | 590 m || 
|-id=833 bgcolor=#fefefe
| 551833 ||  || — || May 11, 2013 || Mount Lemmon || Mount Lemmon Survey ||  || align=right data-sort-value="0.54" | 540 m || 
|-id=834 bgcolor=#E9E9E9
| 551834 ||  || — || June 16, 2013 || Haleakala || Pan-STARRS ||  || align=right | 1.2 km || 
|-id=835 bgcolor=#fefefe
| 551835 ||  || — || September 19, 2000 || Kitt Peak || Spacewatch ||  || align=right data-sort-value="0.59" | 590 m || 
|-id=836 bgcolor=#E9E9E9
| 551836 ||  || — || August 30, 2005 || Palomar || NEAT ||  || align=right | 1.8 km || 
|-id=837 bgcolor=#FA8072
| 551837 ||  || — || January 15, 2004 || Kitt Peak || Spacewatch ||  || align=right | 1.0 km || 
|-id=838 bgcolor=#E9E9E9
| 551838 ||  || — || May 22, 2013 || Mount Lemmon || Mount Lemmon Survey ||  || align=right data-sort-value="0.94" | 940 m || 
|-id=839 bgcolor=#d6d6d6
| 551839 ||  || — || September 6, 2008 || Mount Lemmon || Mount Lemmon Survey ||  || align=right | 3.1 km || 
|-id=840 bgcolor=#E9E9E9
| 551840 ||  || — || February 27, 2012 || Haleakala || Pan-STARRS ||  || align=right | 1.7 km || 
|-id=841 bgcolor=#FA8072
| 551841 ||  || — || August 19, 2010 || XuYi || PMO NEO ||  || align=right data-sort-value="0.71" | 710 m || 
|-id=842 bgcolor=#E9E9E9
| 551842 ||  || — || August 30, 2005 || Kitt Peak || Spacewatch ||  || align=right | 1.2 km || 
|-id=843 bgcolor=#E9E9E9
| 551843 ||  || — || November 22, 2006 || Mount Lemmon || Mount Lemmon Survey ||  || align=right | 2.9 km || 
|-id=844 bgcolor=#d6d6d6
| 551844 ||  || — || January 2, 2011 || Mount Lemmon || Mount Lemmon Survey ||  || align=right | 2.7 km || 
|-id=845 bgcolor=#d6d6d6
| 551845 ||  || — || December 13, 2010 || Mount Lemmon || Mount Lemmon Survey ||  || align=right | 3.7 km || 
|-id=846 bgcolor=#fefefe
| 551846 ||  || — || September 9, 2010 || Kitt Peak || Spacewatch ||  || align=right data-sort-value="0.75" | 750 m || 
|-id=847 bgcolor=#d6d6d6
| 551847 ||  || — || December 10, 2005 || Kitt Peak || Spacewatch ||  || align=right | 4.0 km || 
|-id=848 bgcolor=#fefefe
| 551848 ||  || — || March 23, 2006 || Kitt Peak || Spacewatch ||  || align=right data-sort-value="0.59" | 590 m || 
|-id=849 bgcolor=#E9E9E9
| 551849 ||  || — || October 29, 2005 || Catalina || CSS ||  || align=right | 2.4 km || 
|-id=850 bgcolor=#E9E9E9
| 551850 ||  || — || July 10, 2013 || Elena Remote || A. Oreshko ||  || align=right | 2.7 km || 
|-id=851 bgcolor=#d6d6d6
| 551851 ||  || — || July 13, 2013 || Mount Lemmon || Mount Lemmon Survey ||  || align=right | 3.7 km || 
|-id=852 bgcolor=#E9E9E9
| 551852 ||  || — || July 17, 2004 || Palomar || NEAT ||  || align=right | 2.7 km || 
|-id=853 bgcolor=#E9E9E9
| 551853 ||  || — || January 26, 2006 || Mount Lemmon || Mount Lemmon Survey ||  || align=right | 2.2 km || 
|-id=854 bgcolor=#E9E9E9
| 551854 ||  || — || August 8, 2004 || Palomar || NEAT ||  || align=right | 1.8 km || 
|-id=855 bgcolor=#d6d6d6
| 551855 ||  || — || February 25, 2011 || Mount Lemmon || Mount Lemmon Survey ||  || align=right | 1.9 km || 
|-id=856 bgcolor=#E9E9E9
| 551856 ||  || — || February 6, 2002 || Kitt Peak || Spacewatch ||  || align=right | 1.8 km || 
|-id=857 bgcolor=#E9E9E9
| 551857 ||  || — || April 27, 2012 || Haleakala || Pan-STARRS ||  || align=right | 2.0 km || 
|-id=858 bgcolor=#d6d6d6
| 551858 ||  || — || February 25, 2011 || Mount Lemmon || Mount Lemmon Survey ||  || align=right | 1.8 km || 
|-id=859 bgcolor=#E9E9E9
| 551859 ||  || — || September 26, 2009 || Kitt Peak || Spacewatch ||  || align=right | 1.8 km || 
|-id=860 bgcolor=#E9E9E9
| 551860 ||  || — || September 28, 2009 || Kitt Peak || Spacewatch ||  || align=right | 2.1 km || 
|-id=861 bgcolor=#E9E9E9
| 551861 ||  || — || September 2, 2014 || Haleakala || Pan-STARRS ||  || align=right | 2.0 km || 
|-id=862 bgcolor=#d6d6d6
| 551862 ||  || — || January 28, 2004 || Kitt Peak || Spacewatch ||  || align=right | 2.9 km || 
|-id=863 bgcolor=#E9E9E9
| 551863 ||  || — || August 3, 2014 || Haleakala || Pan-STARRS ||  || align=right | 1.5 km || 
|-id=864 bgcolor=#d6d6d6
| 551864 ||  || — || January 22, 1998 || Kitt Peak || Spacewatch ||  || align=right | 2.7 km || 
|-id=865 bgcolor=#d6d6d6
| 551865 ||  || — || July 15, 2013 || Haleakala || Pan-STARRS ||  || align=right | 2.5 km || 
|-id=866 bgcolor=#fefefe
| 551866 ||  || — || July 13, 2013 || Haleakala || Pan-STARRS ||  || align=right data-sort-value="0.72" | 720 m || 
|-id=867 bgcolor=#C2FFFF
| 551867 ||  || — || July 13, 2013 || Haleakala || Pan-STARRS || L5 || align=right | 9.9 km || 
|-id=868 bgcolor=#fefefe
| 551868 ||  || — || July 14, 2013 || Haleakala || Pan-STARRS ||  || align=right data-sort-value="0.64" | 640 m || 
|-id=869 bgcolor=#FA8072
| 551869 ||  || — || July 1, 2013 || Haleakala || Pan-STARRS ||  || align=right data-sort-value="0.75" | 750 m || 
|-id=870 bgcolor=#d6d6d6
| 551870 ||  || — || June 15, 2007 || Kitt Peak || Spacewatch ||  || align=right | 3.8 km || 
|-id=871 bgcolor=#E9E9E9
| 551871 ||  || — || October 26, 2005 || Kitt Peak || Spacewatch ||  || align=right | 2.2 km || 
|-id=872 bgcolor=#fefefe
| 551872 ||  || — || March 21, 2009 || Mount Lemmon || Mount Lemmon Survey ||  || align=right data-sort-value="0.43" | 430 m || 
|-id=873 bgcolor=#fefefe
| 551873 ||  || — || August 17, 2006 || Palomar || NEAT ||  || align=right data-sort-value="0.71" | 710 m || 
|-id=874 bgcolor=#E9E9E9
| 551874 ||  || — || June 30, 2013 || Haleakala || Pan-STARRS ||  || align=right | 2.5 km || 
|-id=875 bgcolor=#E9E9E9
| 551875 ||  || — || September 25, 2005 || Kitt Peak || Spacewatch ||  || align=right | 1.5 km || 
|-id=876 bgcolor=#E9E9E9
| 551876 ||  || — || November 30, 2014 || Haleakala || Pan-STARRS ||  || align=right | 2.4 km || 
|-id=877 bgcolor=#d6d6d6
| 551877 ||  || — || April 15, 2001 || Kitt Peak || Spacewatch || EOS || align=right | 1.9 km || 
|-id=878 bgcolor=#E9E9E9
| 551878 ||  || — || February 29, 2012 || Mount Graham || R. P. Boyle, V. Laugalys ||  || align=right | 2.3 km || 
|-id=879 bgcolor=#d6d6d6
| 551879 ||  || — || August 3, 2013 || Haleakala || Pan-STARRS ||  || align=right | 2.3 km || 
|-id=880 bgcolor=#fefefe
| 551880 ||  || — || February 13, 2012 || Haleakala || Pan-STARRS ||  || align=right data-sort-value="0.90" | 900 m || 
|-id=881 bgcolor=#d6d6d6
| 551881 ||  || — || August 15, 2004 || Campo Imperatore || CINEOS ||  || align=right | 2.9 km || 
|-id=882 bgcolor=#E9E9E9
| 551882 ||  || — || July 14, 2013 || Haleakala || Pan-STARRS ||  || align=right | 2.0 km || 
|-id=883 bgcolor=#E9E9E9
| 551883 ||  || — || December 1, 2000 || Kitt Peak || Spacewatch ||  || align=right | 2.4 km || 
|-id=884 bgcolor=#fefefe
| 551884 ||  || — || October 17, 2006 || Catalina || CSS ||  || align=right data-sort-value="0.75" | 750 m || 
|-id=885 bgcolor=#E9E9E9
| 551885 ||  || — || March 16, 2012 || Mount Lemmon || Mount Lemmon Survey ||  || align=right | 1.9 km || 
|-id=886 bgcolor=#d6d6d6
| 551886 ||  || — || September 21, 2003 || Kitt Peak || Spacewatch ||  || align=right | 2.7 km || 
|-id=887 bgcolor=#fefefe
| 551887 ||  || — || November 19, 2003 || Socorro || LINEAR ||  || align=right data-sort-value="0.84" | 840 m || 
|-id=888 bgcolor=#d6d6d6
| 551888 ||  || — || August 8, 2013 || Kitt Peak || Spacewatch ||  || align=right | 2.8 km || 
|-id=889 bgcolor=#d6d6d6
| 551889 ||  || — || March 9, 2005 || Mount Lemmon || Mount Lemmon Survey ||  || align=right | 2.7 km || 
|-id=890 bgcolor=#fefefe
| 551890 ||  || — || August 16, 2006 || Palomar || NEAT ||  || align=right data-sort-value="0.71" | 710 m || 
|-id=891 bgcolor=#fefefe
| 551891 ||  || — || November 13, 2010 || Kitt Peak || Spacewatch ||  || align=right data-sort-value="0.65" | 650 m || 
|-id=892 bgcolor=#fefefe
| 551892 ||  || — || January 30, 2008 || Mount Lemmon || Mount Lemmon Survey ||  || align=right data-sort-value="0.73" | 730 m || 
|-id=893 bgcolor=#E9E9E9
| 551893 ||  || — || April 20, 2012 || Siding Spring || SSS ||  || align=right | 2.4 km || 
|-id=894 bgcolor=#d6d6d6
| 551894 ||  || — || September 23, 2003 || Haleakala || AMOS ||  || align=right | 4.6 km || 
|-id=895 bgcolor=#fefefe
| 551895 ||  || — || July 14, 2013 || Haleakala || Pan-STARRS ||  || align=right data-sort-value="0.75" | 750 m || 
|-id=896 bgcolor=#E9E9E9
| 551896 ||  || — || March 16, 2012 || Catalina || CSS ||  || align=right | 2.9 km || 
|-id=897 bgcolor=#d6d6d6
| 551897 ||  || — || November 21, 2008 || Kitt Peak || Spacewatch ||  || align=right | 3.1 km || 
|-id=898 bgcolor=#C2FFFF
| 551898 ||  || — || August 9, 2013 || Kitt Peak || Spacewatch || L5 || align=right | 7.7 km || 
|-id=899 bgcolor=#fefefe
| 551899 ||  || — || October 13, 2010 || Mount Lemmon || Mount Lemmon Survey ||  || align=right data-sort-value="0.77" | 770 m || 
|-id=900 bgcolor=#E9E9E9
| 551900 ||  || — || August 10, 2013 || iTelescope || P. B. Lake || TIN || align=right | 1.2 km || 
|}

551901–552000 

|-bgcolor=#d6d6d6
| 551901 ||  || — || August 28, 2003 || Palomar || NEAT ||  || align=right | 2.9 km || 
|-id=902 bgcolor=#d6d6d6
| 551902 ||  || — || September 23, 2008 || Kitt Peak || Spacewatch ||  || align=right | 2.8 km || 
|-id=903 bgcolor=#d6d6d6
| 551903 ||  || — || February 12, 2004 || Kitt Peak || Spacewatch ||  || align=right | 3.2 km || 
|-id=904 bgcolor=#E9E9E9
| 551904 ||  || — || September 19, 2009 || Kitt Peak || Spacewatch ||  || align=right | 1.8 km || 
|-id=905 bgcolor=#d6d6d6
| 551905 ||  || — || September 30, 2003 || Kitt Peak || Spacewatch ||  || align=right | 2.3 km || 
|-id=906 bgcolor=#E9E9E9
| 551906 ||  || — || December 6, 2011 || Haleakala || Pan-STARRS ||  || align=right | 2.8 km || 
|-id=907 bgcolor=#E9E9E9
| 551907 ||  || — || July 15, 2013 || Haleakala || Pan-STARRS ||  || align=right | 1.9 km || 
|-id=908 bgcolor=#E9E9E9
| 551908 ||  || — || August 31, 2000 || Socorro || LINEAR ||  || align=right | 1.5 km || 
|-id=909 bgcolor=#fefefe
| 551909 ||  || — || August 4, 2013 || Haleakala || Pan-STARRS ||  || align=right data-sort-value="0.68" | 680 m || 
|-id=910 bgcolor=#E9E9E9
| 551910 ||  || — || October 27, 2009 || Mount Lemmon || Mount Lemmon Survey ||  || align=right | 1.4 km || 
|-id=911 bgcolor=#d6d6d6
| 551911 ||  || — || February 25, 2006 || Mount Lemmon || Mount Lemmon Survey ||  || align=right | 1.9 km || 
|-id=912 bgcolor=#d6d6d6
| 551912 ||  || — || July 29, 2008 || Kitt Peak || Spacewatch ||  || align=right | 2.3 km || 
|-id=913 bgcolor=#d6d6d6
| 551913 ||  || — || February 13, 2011 || Mount Lemmon || Mount Lemmon Survey ||  || align=right | 2.0 km || 
|-id=914 bgcolor=#d6d6d6
| 551914 ||  || — || February 13, 2011 || Mount Lemmon || Mount Lemmon Survey ||  || align=right | 2.0 km || 
|-id=915 bgcolor=#E9E9E9
| 551915 ||  || — || August 7, 2013 || ESA OGS || ESA OGS ||  || align=right | 2.1 km || 
|-id=916 bgcolor=#fefefe
| 551916 ||  || — || November 1, 2010 || Mount Lemmon || Mount Lemmon Survey ||  || align=right data-sort-value="0.68" | 680 m || 
|-id=917 bgcolor=#d6d6d6
| 551917 ||  || — || August 15, 2013 || Haleakala || Pan-STARRS ||  || align=right | 1.7 km || 
|-id=918 bgcolor=#E9E9E9
| 551918 ||  || — || January 12, 2011 || Mount Lemmon || Mount Lemmon Survey ||  || align=right | 2.1 km || 
|-id=919 bgcolor=#fefefe
| 551919 ||  || — || August 15, 2013 || Haleakala || Pan-STARRS ||  || align=right data-sort-value="0.62" | 620 m || 
|-id=920 bgcolor=#d6d6d6
| 551920 ||  || — || November 15, 2003 || Kitt Peak || Spacewatch ||  || align=right | 2.3 km || 
|-id=921 bgcolor=#d6d6d6
| 551921 ||  || — || August 12, 2013 || Haleakala || Pan-STARRS ||  || align=right | 2.7 km || 
|-id=922 bgcolor=#d6d6d6
| 551922 ||  || — || August 14, 2013 || Haleakala || Pan-STARRS ||  || align=right | 2.8 km || 
|-id=923 bgcolor=#d6d6d6
| 551923 ||  || — || September 27, 2008 || Mount Lemmon || Mount Lemmon Survey ||  || align=right | 2.2 km || 
|-id=924 bgcolor=#d6d6d6
| 551924 ||  || — || November 28, 2014 || Haleakala || Pan-STARRS ||  || align=right | 1.9 km || 
|-id=925 bgcolor=#d6d6d6
| 551925 ||  || — || August 15, 2013 || Haleakala || Pan-STARRS ||  || align=right | 2.2 km || 
|-id=926 bgcolor=#d6d6d6
| 551926 ||  || — || August 8, 2013 || Haleakala || Pan-STARRS ||  || align=right | 2.5 km || 
|-id=927 bgcolor=#d6d6d6
| 551927 ||  || — || August 14, 2013 || Haleakala || Pan-STARRS ||  || align=right | 2.4 km || 
|-id=928 bgcolor=#fefefe
| 551928 ||  || — || August 14, 2013 || Haleakala || Pan-STARRS ||  || align=right data-sort-value="0.49" | 490 m || 
|-id=929 bgcolor=#d6d6d6
| 551929 ||  || — || August 8, 2013 || Haleakala || Pan-STARRS ||  || align=right | 2.0 km || 
|-id=930 bgcolor=#fefefe
| 551930 ||  || — || August 9, 2013 || Kitt Peak || Spacewatch ||  || align=right data-sort-value="0.71" | 710 m || 
|-id=931 bgcolor=#E9E9E9
| 551931 ||  || — || August 8, 2013 || Haleakala || Pan-STARRS ||  || align=right | 1.8 km || 
|-id=932 bgcolor=#E9E9E9
| 551932 ||  || — || November 26, 2005 || Kitt Peak || Spacewatch ||  || align=right | 1.7 km || 
|-id=933 bgcolor=#E9E9E9
| 551933 ||  || — || January 25, 2003 || La Silla || A. Boattini, O. R. Hainaut ||  || align=right | 1.7 km || 
|-id=934 bgcolor=#d6d6d6
| 551934 ||  || — || October 22, 2003 || Kitt Peak || Spacewatch ||  || align=right | 2.3 km || 
|-id=935 bgcolor=#fefefe
| 551935 ||  || — || September 23, 2003 || Palomar || NEAT ||  || align=right data-sort-value="0.65" | 650 m || 
|-id=936 bgcolor=#fefefe
| 551936 ||  || — || July 8, 2013 || Siding Spring || SSS || H || align=right data-sort-value="0.72" | 720 m || 
|-id=937 bgcolor=#d6d6d6
| 551937 ||  || — || October 20, 2003 || Kitt Peak || Spacewatch || TEL || align=right | 1.6 km || 
|-id=938 bgcolor=#d6d6d6
| 551938 ||  || — || August 12, 2013 || Kitt Peak || Spacewatch ||  || align=right | 2.3 km || 
|-id=939 bgcolor=#d6d6d6
| 551939 ||  || — || September 18, 2003 || Kitt Peak || Spacewatch ||  || align=right | 2.1 km || 
|-id=940 bgcolor=#d6d6d6
| 551940 ||  || — || September 4, 2008 || Kitt Peak || Spacewatch ||  || align=right | 2.2 km || 
|-id=941 bgcolor=#FA8072
| 551941 ||  || — || September 4, 2010 || Kitt Peak || Spacewatch ||  || align=right data-sort-value="0.71" | 710 m || 
|-id=942 bgcolor=#d6d6d6
| 551942 ||  || — || August 26, 2013 || Haleakala || Pan-STARRS ||  || align=right | 2.3 km || 
|-id=943 bgcolor=#fefefe
| 551943 ||  || — || October 13, 1999 || Apache Point || SDSS Collaboration || V || align=right data-sort-value="0.47" | 470 m || 
|-id=944 bgcolor=#fefefe
| 551944 ||  || — || August 27, 2006 || Anderson Mesa || LONEOS || (2076) || align=right data-sort-value="0.78" | 780 m || 
|-id=945 bgcolor=#d6d6d6
| 551945 ||  || — || February 4, 2006 || Kitt Peak || Spacewatch || KOR || align=right | 1.7 km || 
|-id=946 bgcolor=#d6d6d6
| 551946 ||  || — || March 6, 2011 || Mount Lemmon || Mount Lemmon Survey ||  || align=right | 2.4 km || 
|-id=947 bgcolor=#d6d6d6
| 551947 ||  || — || April 2, 2011 || Kitt Peak || Spacewatch ||  || align=right | 3.2 km || 
|-id=948 bgcolor=#E9E9E9
| 551948 ||  || — || December 28, 2005 || Kitt Peak || Spacewatch ||  || align=right | 2.0 km || 
|-id=949 bgcolor=#d6d6d6
| 551949 ||  || — || September 6, 2008 || Mount Lemmon || Mount Lemmon Survey ||  || align=right | 2.9 km || 
|-id=950 bgcolor=#E9E9E9
| 551950 ||  || — || February 23, 2007 || Mount Lemmon || Mount Lemmon Survey ||  || align=right | 2.9 km || 
|-id=951 bgcolor=#d6d6d6
| 551951 ||  || — || January 8, 2006 || Mount Lemmon || Mount Lemmon Survey ||  || align=right | 2.4 km || 
|-id=952 bgcolor=#E9E9E9
| 551952 ||  || — || December 3, 2005 || Kitt Peak || Spacewatch ||  || align=right | 2.1 km || 
|-id=953 bgcolor=#E9E9E9
| 551953 ||  || — || August 21, 2004 || Siding Spring || SSS ||  || align=right | 2.3 km || 
|-id=954 bgcolor=#d6d6d6
| 551954 ||  || — || April 24, 2012 || Haleakala || Pan-STARRS ||  || align=right | 2.4 km || 
|-id=955 bgcolor=#fefefe
| 551955 ||  || — || October 31, 2010 || Kitt Peak || Spacewatch ||  || align=right data-sort-value="0.68" | 680 m || 
|-id=956 bgcolor=#d6d6d6
| 551956 ||  || — || August 9, 2013 || Kitt Peak || Spacewatch ||  || align=right | 2.0 km || 
|-id=957 bgcolor=#d6d6d6
| 551957 ||  || — || August 26, 2013 || Haleakala || Pan-STARRS ||  || align=right | 2.4 km || 
|-id=958 bgcolor=#fefefe
| 551958 ||  || — || August 15, 2013 || Haleakala || Pan-STARRS ||  || align=right data-sort-value="0.71" | 710 m || 
|-id=959 bgcolor=#E9E9E9
| 551959 ||  || — || January 28, 2007 || Mount Lemmon || Mount Lemmon Survey ||  || align=right | 1.4 km || 
|-id=960 bgcolor=#d6d6d6
| 551960 ||  || — || October 16, 2002 || Palomar || NEAT ||  || align=right | 3.4 km || 
|-id=961 bgcolor=#d6d6d6
| 551961 ||  || — || February 25, 2011 || Kitt Peak || Spacewatch ||  || align=right | 2.9 km || 
|-id=962 bgcolor=#d6d6d6
| 551962 ||  || — || November 6, 2008 || Mount Lemmon || Mount Lemmon Survey ||  || align=right | 2.9 km || 
|-id=963 bgcolor=#d6d6d6
| 551963 ||  || — || January 30, 2011 || Haleakala || Pan-STARRS ||  || align=right | 1.8 km || 
|-id=964 bgcolor=#d6d6d6
| 551964 ||  || — || August 14, 2013 || Haleakala || Pan-STARRS ||  || align=right | 2.5 km || 
|-id=965 bgcolor=#d6d6d6
| 551965 ||  || — || August 26, 2013 || Haleakala || Pan-STARRS ||  || align=right | 2.0 km || 
|-id=966 bgcolor=#d6d6d6
| 551966 ||  || — || August 9, 2013 || Kitt Peak || Spacewatch ||  || align=right | 2.2 km || 
|-id=967 bgcolor=#E9E9E9
| 551967 ||  || — || April 1, 2003 || Apache Point || SDSS Collaboration ||  || align=right | 2.3 km || 
|-id=968 bgcolor=#d6d6d6
| 551968 ||  || — || August 18, 2002 || Palomar || NEAT ||  || align=right | 3.3 km || 
|-id=969 bgcolor=#E9E9E9
| 551969 ||  || — || October 14, 2009 || Mount Lemmon || Mount Lemmon Survey ||  || align=right | 1.4 km || 
|-id=970 bgcolor=#E9E9E9
| 551970 ||  || — || August 9, 2013 || Haleakala || Pan-STARRS ||  || align=right | 2.2 km || 
|-id=971 bgcolor=#d6d6d6
| 551971 ||  || — || August 4, 2003 || Kitt Peak || Spacewatch ||  || align=right | 2.5 km || 
|-id=972 bgcolor=#d6d6d6
| 551972 ||  || — || August 8, 2013 || Kitt Peak || Spacewatch ||  || align=right | 3.5 km || 
|-id=973 bgcolor=#d6d6d6
| 551973 ||  || — || September 3, 2002 || Palomar || NEAT || Tj (2.96) || align=right | 2.9 km || 
|-id=974 bgcolor=#fefefe
| 551974 ||  || — || June 20, 2013 || Mount Lemmon || Mount Lemmon Survey ||  || align=right data-sort-value="0.62" | 620 m || 
|-id=975 bgcolor=#fefefe
| 551975 ||  || — || August 26, 2013 || Haleakala || Pan-STARRS ||  || align=right data-sort-value="0.65" | 650 m || 
|-id=976 bgcolor=#fefefe
| 551976 ||  || — || September 22, 2003 || Kitt Peak || Spacewatch ||  || align=right data-sort-value="0.68" | 680 m || 
|-id=977 bgcolor=#d6d6d6
| 551977 ||  || — || December 1, 2005 || Kitt Peak || L. H. Wasserman, R. Millis ||  || align=right | 3.2 km || 
|-id=978 bgcolor=#d6d6d6
| 551978 ||  || — || January 13, 2011 || Mount Lemmon || Mount Lemmon Survey || BRA || align=right | 1.5 km || 
|-id=979 bgcolor=#fefefe
| 551979 ||  || — || October 23, 2006 || Catalina || CSS ||  || align=right data-sort-value="0.73" | 730 m || 
|-id=980 bgcolor=#d6d6d6
| 551980 ||  || — || February 14, 2010 || Mount Lemmon || Mount Lemmon Survey ||  || align=right | 3.1 km || 
|-id=981 bgcolor=#fefefe
| 551981 ||  || — || August 9, 2013 || Kitt Peak || Spacewatch ||  || align=right data-sort-value="0.65" | 650 m || 
|-id=982 bgcolor=#E9E9E9
| 551982 ||  || — || March 7, 2003 || Socorro || LINEAR ||  || align=right | 1.8 km || 
|-id=983 bgcolor=#d6d6d6
| 551983 ||  || — || September 12, 2002 || Palomar || NEAT ||  || align=right | 4.2 km || 
|-id=984 bgcolor=#fefefe
| 551984 ||  || — || August 12, 2013 || Kitt Peak || Spacewatch ||  || align=right data-sort-value="0.78" | 780 m || 
|-id=985 bgcolor=#d6d6d6
| 551985 ||  || — || August 3, 2008 || Charleston || R. Holmes ||  || align=right | 3.1 km || 
|-id=986 bgcolor=#d6d6d6
| 551986 ||  || — || April 9, 2005 || Mount Lemmon || Mount Lemmon Survey || EUP || align=right | 3.4 km || 
|-id=987 bgcolor=#fefefe
| 551987 ||  || — || August 16, 2002 || Palomar || NEAT || V || align=right data-sort-value="0.59" | 590 m || 
|-id=988 bgcolor=#d6d6d6
| 551988 ||  || — || September 2, 2013 || Mount Lemmon || Mount Lemmon Survey ||  || align=right | 2.7 km || 
|-id=989 bgcolor=#fefefe
| 551989 ||  || — || September 3, 2013 || Haleakala || Pan-STARRS ||  || align=right data-sort-value="0.51" | 510 m || 
|-id=990 bgcolor=#fefefe
| 551990 ||  || — || October 15, 2006 || Kitt Peak || Spacewatch ||  || align=right data-sort-value="0.65" | 650 m || 
|-id=991 bgcolor=#fefefe
| 551991 ||  || — || March 3, 2005 || Kitt Peak || Spacewatch ||  || align=right data-sort-value="0.66" | 660 m || 
|-id=992 bgcolor=#d6d6d6
| 551992 ||  || — || September 18, 2003 || Kitt Peak || Spacewatch || KOR || align=right | 1.1 km || 
|-id=993 bgcolor=#E9E9E9
| 551993 ||  || — || September 7, 2004 || Palomar || NEAT ||  || align=right | 2.3 km || 
|-id=994 bgcolor=#fefefe
| 551994 ||  || — || March 15, 2007 || San Marcello || Pistoia Mountains Obs. || H || align=right data-sort-value="0.75" | 750 m || 
|-id=995 bgcolor=#d6d6d6
| 551995 ||  || — || November 1, 1999 || Kitt Peak || Spacewatch ||  || align=right | 2.3 km || 
|-id=996 bgcolor=#d6d6d6
| 551996 ||  || — || January 17, 2005 || Kitt Peak || Spacewatch ||  || align=right | 3.9 km || 
|-id=997 bgcolor=#E9E9E9
| 551997 ||  || — || April 28, 2003 || Anderson Mesa || LONEOS ||  || align=right | 3.2 km || 
|-id=998 bgcolor=#d6d6d6
| 551998 ||  || — || September 9, 2013 || Haleakala || Pan-STARRS ||  || align=right | 2.5 km || 
|-id=999 bgcolor=#d6d6d6
| 551999 ||  || — || September 22, 2008 || Kitt Peak || Spacewatch ||  || align=right | 2.7 km || 
|-id=000 bgcolor=#d6d6d6
| 552000 ||  || — || October 8, 2008 || Mount Lemmon || Mount Lemmon Survey ||  || align=right | 2.5 km || 
|}

References

External links 
 Discovery Circumstances: Numbered Minor Planets (550001)–(555000) (IAU Minor Planet Center)

0551